

I 

 I'm entitled to my opinion
 I-Ching
 I Am a Strange Loop
 I and Thou
 I Ching
 I Heart Huckabees
 I Hope I Shall Arrive Soon
 I know it when I see it
 I know that I know nothing
 I problemi della guerra e le vie della pace
 I. A. Richards
 Iain Hamilton Grant
 Iamblichus
 Iamblichus (philosopher)
 Ian Bone
 Ian Buchanan (philosopher)
 Ian Hacking
 Ian Ramsey
 Ian Robinson (rationalist)
 Ian Thomas Ramsey
 Iatrogenesis
 Ibn al-Arabi
 Ibn al-Nafis
 Ibn al-Rawandi
 Ibn ar-Rawandi
 Ibn Arabi
 Ibn Bajjah
 Ibn Daud
 Ibn Falaquera
 Ibn Gabirol
 Ibn Hazm
 Ibn Kammuna
 Ibn Khaldun
 Ibn Khaldūn
 Ibn Masarra
 Ibn Masarrah
 Ibn Miskawayh
 Ibn Rushd
 Ibn Sabin
 Ibn Sina
 Ibn Sīnā
 Ibn Taymiya
 Ibn Taymiyyah
 Ibn Tufail
 Ibn Ţufayl
 Ibn Tzaddik
 İbrahim Hakkı Erzurumi
 İbrahim Özdemir
 Ichthyas
 Icon
 Id, ego and super-ego
 Ida Mett
 Idea
 Idea for a Universal History with a Cosmopolitan Purpose
 Idea of Progress
 Ideal (ethics)
 Ideal language
 Ideal observer theory
 Ideal speech situation
 Ideal type
 Idealism
 Idealistic pluralism
 Idealistic Studies
 Idealization (science philosophy)
 Idea
 Ideas and Action
 Ideas Have Consequences
 Idée reçue
 Idempotency of entailment
 Identity (philosophy)
 Identity formation
 Identity of indiscernibles
 Identity politics
 Identity theory of mind
 Identity thesis
 Identityism
 Ideographic
 Ideological repression
 Ideology
 Ideomotor effect
 Idiolect
 Idios kosmos
 Idol (philosophy)
 Idolon tribus
 Idols of the cave
 Idols of the mind
 Idols of the tribe
 Idomeneus of Lampsacus
 Ietsism
 If
 If-by-whiskey
 If a tree falls in a forest
 If and only if
 Iff
 Ignacio de Arbieto
 Ignacio Ellacuría
 Ignoramus et ignorabimus
 Ignoratio elenchi
 Ignosticism
 Ignotum per ignotius
 Igor Pribac
 Igor Yefimov
 Ihsan
 Ikeda Mitsumasa
 Iki (aesthetic ideal)
 Ikki Kita
 Ilkka Niiniluoto
 Illative
 Illegalism
 Illicit major
 Illicit minor
 Illocutionary act
 Illocutionary force
 Illtyd Trethowan
 Illuminati
 Illumination
 Illuminationism
 Illuminationist philosophy
 Illusion
 Illusion of asymmetric insight
 Illusion of control
 Illusion of transparency
 Illusionism (philosophy)
 Illusions
 Illusory correlation
 Illustrius Pusaeus
 Image
 Imagery
 Imaginary
 Imaginary Conversations
 Imagination
 Imaging
 Immaculate perception
 Immanence
 Immanent critique
 Immanent evaluation
 Immanuel Ben Solomon of Rome
 Immanuel Hermann Fichte
 Immanuel Kant
 Immanuel the Roman
 Immaterial
 Immaterial force
 Immaterialism
 Immediacy (philosophy)
 Immediate inference
 Immediatism
 Immigration Act of 1917
 Immortality
 Immortality of the soul
 Immunology
 Immutability
 Impact bias
 Impartiality
 Impenetrability
 Imperative
 Imperative logic
 Imperfect induction
 Imperialism
 Imperium
 Impermanence
 Implicant
 Implication
 Implications of nanotechnology
 Implicature
 Imposition
 Impossible world
 Impredicative definition
 Impredicative property
 Impredicativity
 Impression
 Imre Lakatos
 In a Different Voice
 In Defense of Anarchism
 In Praise of Shadows
 In Search of Lost Time
 In Search of the Miraculous
 In vitro fertilisation
 Incarnation and Christology
 Incarnational humanism
 Inclusion (logic)
 Inclusive Democracy
 Inclusive disjunction
 Incoherence
 Incompatibilism
 Incompatible-properties argument
 Incomplete comparison
 Incompleteness
 Incompleteness theorem
 Incompleteness theorems
 Inconnu Independent Art Group
 Inconsistent triad
 Incontinence (philosophy)
 Incorporeality
 Incorrigibility
 Indefinite monism
 Independence
 Independence-friendly logic
 Indeterminacy
 Indeterminacy (philosophy)
 Indeterminacy debate in legal theory
 Indeterminacy of translation
 Indeterminacy principle
 Indeterminacy problem
 Indeterminate
 Indeterminism
 Index of aesthetics articles
 Index of ancient philosophy articles
 Index of epistemology articles
 Index of ethics articles
 Index of logic articles
 Index of metaphysics articles
 Index of philosophers
 Index of philosophy
 Index of philosophy articles
 Index of philosophy articles (A–C)
 Index of philosophy articles (D–H)
 Index of philosophy articles (R–Z)
 Index of philosophy of mind articles
 Index of social and political philosophy articles
 Indexed language
 Indexical
 Indexicality
 Indexicals
 Indian philosophy
 Indian political philosophy
 Indicative conditional
 Indicative conditionals
 Indicator
 Indifference
 Indifferent act
 Indigenism
 Indirect proof
 Indirect self-reference
 Indiscernibility
 Individual
 Individual reclamation
 Individualism
 Individualism and Economic Order
 Individualist anarchism
 Individualist ethical subjectivism
 Individuation
 Indo-European copula
 Indoctrination
 Indonesian philosophy
 Indra Sen
 Indriya
 Inductionism
 Inductive definition
 Inductive inference
 Inductive reasoning
 Inductivism
 Industrial espionage
 Industrialisation
 Ineffability
 Ineffective assistance of counsel
 Inequality
 Inequality Reexamined
 Infallibilism
 Infallibility
 Inference
 Inference rule
 Inference to the best explanation
 Inferential role semantics
 Infinitary logic
 Infinitary logics
 Infinite
 Infinite divisibility
 Infinite qualitative distinction
 Infinite regress
 Infinitesimals
 Infinitism
 Infinity
 Infinity (philosophy)
 Influence and reception of Friedrich Nietzsche
 Informal fallacy
 Informal logic
 Informal mathematics
 Information bias (psychology)
 Information ethics
 Information theory
 Informed consent
 Informed refusal
 Infoshop
 Infoshop.org
 Ingeborg Bachmann
 Ingeborg i Mjärhult
 Ingo Zechner
 Ingroup bias
 Ingsoc
 Inherence
 Inherence relation
 Inherent
 Inherent value
 Inherently funny word
 Iniciales
 Inka
 Innate idea
 Innate ideas
 Innate knowledge
 Innatism
 Inne pieśni
 Inner peace
 Innocence
 Inocenc Arnošt Bláha
 Inoue Tetsujirō
 Inquiry
 Inside Front
 Insight
 Insolubilia
 Instantiation
 Instantiation principle
 Institute for Anarchist Studies
 Institute for Ethics and Emerging Technologies
 Institute for the Secularisation of Islamic Society
 Institute of Pacific Relations
 Institution
 Institutional Critique
 Institutional cruelty
 Institutional theory of art
 Institutionalism
 Instrumental conditioning
 Instrumental rationality
 Instrumental value
 Instrumentalism
 Insufficient reason
 Insurrectionary anarchism
 Integral theory (Ken Wilber)
 Integral humanism (India)
 Integral humanism (Maritain)
 Integrative level
 Integrity
 Intellectual
 Intellectual dishonesty
 Intellectual history
 Intellectual responsibility
 Intellectual virtue
 Intellectualism
 Intelligence
 Intelligence (trait)
 Intelligent design
 Intelligent design theory
 Intelligibility (philosophy)
 Intelligible form
 Intended interpretation
 Intension
 Intensional definition
 Intensional logic
 Intensional statement
 Intensionality
 Intensive Science and Virtual Philosophy
 Intention
 Intentional fallacy
 Intentional Logic
 Intentional object
 Intentional stance
 Intentionality
 Interactionism
 Interactionism (philosophy of mind)
 Interculturalism
 Interdependence
 Interests
 Intergenerational equity
 Intergenerational justice
 Interior algebra
 Internal discourse
 Internal realism
 Internalism
 Internalism and externalism
 Internalization
 International Academy of Humanism
 International Anarchist Congress of Amsterdam
 International Association for Computing and Philosophy
 International Association for Philosophy of Law and Social Philosophy
 International Commission of Jurists
 International Conference of Rome for the Social Defense Against Anarchists
 International Federation of Philosophical Societies
 International Journal of Baudrillard Studies
 International Journal of Žižek Studies
 International law
 International League of Humanists
 International Network of Engineers and Scientists for Global Responsibility
 International of Anarchist Federations
 International Philosophical Quarterly
 International Philosophy Day
 International Philosophy Olympiad
 International relations
 International Society for Philosophy of Music Education
 Internet Encyclopedia of Philosophy
 Internet ethics
 Internet research ethics
 Interoception
 Interpellation
 Interpretability
 Interpretability logic
 Interpretant
 Interpretation (aesthetics)
 Interpretation (logic)
 Interpretation of quantum mechanics
 Interpretive system
 Interpretivism (legal)
 Interregnum
 Intersection
 Intersubjective
 Intersubjective verifiability
 Intersubjectivity
 Intertheoretic reduction
 Interval scale
 Intervening variable
 Intisar-ul-Haque
 Intrinsic and extrinsic properties
 Intrinsic and extrinsic properties (philosophy)
 Intrinsic finality
 Intrinsic good
 Intrinsic properties
 Intrinsic property
 Intrinsic value
 Intrinsic value (animal ethics)
 Intrinsic value (ethics)
 Introduction to Arithmetic
 Introduction to Kant's Anthropology
 Introduction to Mathematical Philosophy
 Introduction to Metaphysics
 Introduction to Objectivist Epistemology
 Introjection
 Introspection
 Introspection illusion
 Intuition (Bergson)
 Intuition (knowledge)
 Intuition (philosophy)
 Intuition pump
 Intuitionism
 Intuitionism in ethics
 Intuitionist logic
 Intuitionistic logic
 Inverse (logic)
 Inverse gambler's fallacy
 Inversion
 Inverted qualia
 Inverted spectrum
 Invincible error
 Invincible ignorance fallacy
 Inviolability
 Invisible dictatorship
 Invisible hand
 Invisible Pink Unicorn
 Involuntary commitment
 Involuntary euthanasia
 Involuntary memory
 Involuntary treatment
 Involution (esoterism)
 Involution (philosophy)
 Ioan Zalomit
 Ioane Petritsi
 Ioanna Kucuradi
 Ion (dialogue)
 Ion Heliade Rădulescu
 Ion of Chios
 Ion Petrovici
 Ionian Enlightenment
 Ionian School (philosophy)
 Iosipos Moisiodax
 Ippen
 Ipso facto
 Ipso jure
 Iranian philosophy
 Irenaean theodicy
 Irenicism
 Iris Marion Young
 Iris Murdoch
 Ironism
 Irony
 Irrational Man: A Study in Existential Philosophy
 Irrationalism
 Irrationalism and aestheticism
 Irrationality
 Irrealism (philosophy)
 Irrealism (the arts)
 Irreducibility
 Irreflexive
 Irrelevant conclusion
 Irreligion
 Irresistible force paradox
 Irreversibility
 Irving Copi
 Irving Singer
 Irving Thalberg, Jr.
 Irwin Edman
 Is-ought distinction
 Is-ought problem
 Is–ought problem
 Is and ought
 Is God Dead?
 Is Logic Empirical?
 Is ought problem
 Is the glass half empty or half full?
 Isaac Abrabanel
 Isaac Abravanel
 Isaac Beeckman
 Isaac ben Joseph ibn Pulgar
 Isaac ben Moses Arama
 Isaac de Pinto
 Isaac Israeli
 Isaac Israeli ben Solomon
 Isaac La Peyrère
 Isaac Levi
 Isaac Malitz
 Isaac Newton
 Isaac of Stella
 Isaac of Troki
 Isaac Passy
 Isaac Puente
 Isaak Benrubi
 Isaak Iselin
 Isabel Paterson
 Isabelle Stengers
 Isagoge
 Isaiah Berlin
 Isidore of Alexandria
 Islam and democracy
 Islamic capitalism
 Islamic ethics
 Islamic fundamentalism
 Islamic fundamentalism in Iran
 Islamic metaphysics
 Islamic Modernism
 Islamic philosophy
 Islamic theology
 Islamization of knowledge
 Ismail al-Faruqi
 Isocrates
 Isomorphism
 Isonomia
 Isotta Nogarola
 Issac La Peyrere
 Issac La Peyrère
 Issues in anarchism
 Isvarakrsna
 Italian Fascism
 Italian philosophy
 Iterative hierarchy
 Ito Jinsai
 Itō Jinsai
 Itsuo Tsuda
 Ivan Aguéli
 Ivan Aleksandrovich Il'in
 Ivan Chtcheglov
 Ivan Ilyin
 Ivan Kireyevsky
 Ivan Orlov (philosopher)
 Ivan Sviták
 Ivan Vyshenskyi
 Ivar Matlaus
 Ivar Mortensson-Egnund
 Ivo Urbančič
 Iyyun

J 

 J. B. Schneewind
 J. Baird Callicott
 J. Barkley Rosser
 J. David Velleman
 J. J. C. Smart
 J. L. Ackrill
 J. L. Austin
 J. L. Mackie
 J. M. E. McTaggart
 J. M. Hinton
 J. O. Urmson
 J. P. Moreland
 J. P. Stern
 J. Paul Reddam
 J. W. R. Dedekind
 J. B. Schneewind
 J. D. Trout
 J. J. C. Smart
 J. W. R. Dedekind
 Ja'far Kashfi
 Jaakko Hintikka
 Jaan Kaplinski
 Jaap Kruithof
 Jacek Salij
 Jack Copeland
 Jack Meiland
 Jack of Diamonds (artists)
 Jack Russell Weinstein
 Jack Smart
 Jack White (trade unionist)
 Jacksonian democracy
 Jacob Acontius
 Jacob ben Nissim
 Jacob Burckhardt
 Jacob Freudenthal
 Jacob Friedrich Fries
 Jacob Friedrich von Abel
 Jacob Golomb
 Jacob Gould Schurman
 Jacob Klapwijk
 Jacob Klein (philosopher)
 Jacob Lorhard
 Jacob Needleman
 Jacobus Arminius
 Jacobus Naveros
 Jacopo Mazzoni
 Jacopo Zabarella
 Jacques-André Naigeon
 Jacques Barzun
 Jacques Bidet
 Jacques Bouveresse
 Jacques Chevalier
 Jacques Derrida
 Jacques Derrida bibliography
 Jacques Ellul
 Jacques Herbrand
 Jacques Lacan
 Jacques Maritain
 Jacques Rancière
 Jacques Rohault
 Jad Hatem
 Jaegwon Kim
 Jaime Balmes
 Jaime Giménez Arbe
 Jaimini
 Jain cosmology
 Jain philosophy
 Jaina philosophy
 Jainism
 Jakob Böhme
 Jakob Friedrich Fries
 Jakob Frohschammer
 Jakob Guttmann (rabbi)
 Jakob Klatzkin
 Jakob Lorber
 Jakob Sigismund Beck
 Jakob Thomasius
 Jakub Górski
 Jakub of Gostynin
 Jamasp
 James-Lange theory
 James-Lange theory of the emotions
 James Allen Graff
 James Beattie (writer)
 James Bissett Pratt
 James Brusseau
 James Bryce, 1st Viscount Bryce
 James Burnett, Lord Monboddo
 James Childress
 James Clerk Maxwell
 James Creed Meredith
 James DiGiovanna
 James Dunbar (writer)
 James E. Faulconer
 James Earl Baumgartner
 James Edwin Creighton
 James F. Conant
 James Ferrier
 James Franklin (philosopher)
 James Frederick Ferrier
 James G. Lennox
 James Griffin (philosopher)
 James Guillaume
 James Gustafson
 James Hall (philosopher)
 James Harrington
 James Harrington (author)
 James Hayden Tufts
 James Heisig
 James Hutchison Stirling
 James Hutton
 James L. Walker
 James M. Edie
 James MacKaye
 James Main Dixon
 James Mark Baldwin
 James Martin (philosopher)
 James Martineau
 James Mathias Fennelly
 James McCosh
 James Mill
 James of Viterbo
 James Otteson
 Jim Flynn
 James R. Griesemer
 James Rachels
 James Robb (philosopher)
 James Robert Brown
 James Tully (philosopher)
 James Ward (psychologist)
 Jamgon Ju Mipham Gyatso
 Jamie Whyte
 Jamil Sidqi al-Zahawi
 Jan Amos Komensky
 Jan Amos Komenský
 Jan Deutsch
 Jan Hus
 Jan Lukasiewicz
 Jan Łukasiewicz
 Jan Mukařovský
 Jan Narveson
 Jan of Stobnica
 Jan Patocka
 Jan Patočka
 Jan Pinborg
 Jan Sniadecki
 Jan Śniadecki
 Jan Sokol (philosopher)
 Jan Szylling
 Jan Wacław Machajski
 Jan Westerhoff
 Jan Woleński
 Jan Zwicky
 Jane Jacobs
 Janet Biehl
 Janet Coleman
 Janet McCracken
 Janet Radcliffe Richards
 Janko Prunk
 János Kis
 Jansenism
 Janus: A Summing Up
 Japanese aesthetics
 Japanese Anarchist Federation
 Japanese philosophy
 Japanese sound symbolism
 Jaroslav Peregrin
 Jason McQuinn
 Jason of Nysa
 Jason Stanley
 Jason Walter Brown
 Jaundice
 Javad Tabatabaei
 Javelin argument
 Javid Nama
 Jawaharlal Nehru
 Jay Newman
 Jay Rosenberg
 Jayanta Bhatta
 Jayarāśi Bhaṭṭa
 Jayatirtha
 Je Tsongkhapa
 Jealousy
 Jean-Baptiste Lamarck
 Jean-Francois Lyotard
 Jean-François Lyotard
 Jean-François Mattéi
 Jean-François Revel
 Jean-François Senault
 Jean-Gaspard Felix Lacher Ravaisson-Mollien
 Jean-Gaspard Félix Lacher Ravaisson-Mollien
 Jean-Jacques Pelletier
 Jean-Jacques Rousseau
 Jean-Louis Calandrini
 Jean-Louis de Lolme
 Jean-Louis Le Moigne
 Jean-Luc Marion
 Jean-Luc Nancy
 Jean-Marc Ferry
 Jean-Marie Guyau
 Jean-Michel Berthelot
 Jean-Paul Audet
 Jean-Paul Sartre
 Jean-Pierre de Crousaz
 Jean-Pierre Faye
 Jean-Pierre Voyer
 Jean-Yves Béziau
 Jean-Yves Girard
 Jean Anthelme Brillat-Savarin
 Jean Baudrillard
 Jean Beaufret
 Jean Bethke Elshtain
 Jean Biès
 Jean Bodin
 Jean Borella
 Jean Bourdeau
 Jean Buridan
 Jean C. Baudet
 Jean Capréolus
 Jean Cavaillès
 Jean Clam
 Jean Curthoys
 Jean de Gerson
 Jean de Silhon
 Jean Elizabeth Hampton
 Jean François de Saint-Lambert
 Jean Gerson
 Jean Grenier
 Jean Guitton
 Jean Hyppolite
 Jean le Rond d'Alembert
 Jean Le Rond d'Alembert
 Jean Leclerc (theologian)
 Jean Meslier
 Jean Nicod
 Jean Nicod Prize
 Jean Philibert Damiron
 Jean Piaget
 Jean Reynaud
 Jean Van Heijenoort
 Jean Wahl
 Jeanne Hersch
 Jedaiah ben Abraham Bedersi
 Jeff Malpas
 Jeff McMahan (philosopher)
 Jeff Monson
 Jeff Paris
 Jeffersonian democracy
 Jeffersonian political philosophy
 Jeffrey Nielsen
 Jen
 Jena romantics
 Jennifer Hornsby
 Jenny Teichman
 Jens Kraft
 Jens Staubrand
 Jeong Do-jeon
 Jeong Yak-yong
 Jeremy Bentham
 Jeremy Butterfield
 Jeremy Waldron
 Jeremy Weate
 Jeroen Groenendijk
 Jerome Frank
 Jerome Frank (lawyer)
 Jerome Ravetz
 Jerrold Katz
 Jerrold Levinson
 Jerry A. Fodor
 Jerry Alan Fodor
 Jerry Farber
 Jerry Fodor
 Jerry Fodor on mental architecture
 Jerry Fodor on mental states
 Jerusalem (Mendelssohn)
 Jerzy Giedymin
 Jerzy Łoś
 Jerzy Perzanowski
 Jerzy Prokopiuk
 Jesaiah Ben-Aharon
 Jesse Mann
 Jesse Prinz
 Jesús Mosterín
 Jesús Padilla Gálvez
 Jewish Bolshevism
 Jewish Communist Labour Party (Poalei Zion)
 Jewish Communist Party (Poalei Zion)
 Jewish Communist Union (Poalei Zion)
 Jewish ethics
 Jewish existentialism
 Jewish Kalam
 Jewish medical ethics
 Jewish philosophy
 Jhana
 Jhāna
 Jia Yi
 Jiao Yu
 Jiddu Krishnamurti
 Jien
 Jim Bell
 Jim Herrick
 Jin Yuelin
 Jindřich Zelený
 Jing Fang
 Jinul
 Jiva Goswami
 Jiyuan Yu
 Jizang
 Jo-ha-kyū
 Joachim Jungius
 Joachim of Fiore
 Joachim of Floris
 Joan Montseny
 Joan Peiró
 Joaquim Carreras I Artau
 Joaquín Ascaso Budria
 Joaquín Maurín
 Joaquín Trincado Mateo
 Jocelin of Soissons
 Jody Azzouni
 Joe Friggieri
 Joel Feinberg
 Joel J. Kupperman
 Joest Lips
 Johan Jakob Borelius
 Johan Robeck
 Johan van Benthem (logician)
 Johan Vilhelm Snellman
 Johann Adam Bergk
 Johann Augustus Eberhard
 Johann Christian Friedrich Holderlin
 Johann Christian Friedrich Hölderlin
 Johann Christian Lossius
 Johann Christoph Friedrich Schiller
 Johann Christoph Friedrich von Schiller
 Johann Christoph Wagenseil
 Johann Eduard Erdmann
 Johann Friedrich Flatt
 Johann Friedrich Herbart
 Johann Georg Hamann
 Johann Georg Heinrich Feder
 Johann Georg Sulzer
 Johann Gottfried Herder
 Johann Gottfried von Herder
 Johann Gottlieb Buhle
 Johann Gottlieb Fichte
 Johann Hast
 Johann Heinrich Abicht
 Johann Heinrich Bisterfeld
 Johann Heinrich Lambert
 Johann Heinrich Loewe
 Johann Heinrich Pabst
 Johann Heinrich Samuel Formey
 Johann Jakob Engel
 Johann Joachim Lange
 Johann Joachim Spalding
 Johann Karl Friedrich Rosenkranz
 Johann Nepomuk Ehrlich
 Johann Nepomuk Oischinger
 Johann Philipp Siebenkees
 Johann Sturm
 Johann Ulrich von Cramer
 Johann Wolfgang von Goethe
 Johannes Agnoli
 Johannes Bredenburg
 Johannes Clauberg
 Johannes de Muris
 Johannes de Raey
 Johannes Jacobus Poortman
 Johannes Kepler
 Johannes Nikolaus Tetens
 Johannes Philoponus
 Johannes Phocylides Holwarda
 Johannes Rehmke
 Johannes Scotus Eriugena
 Johannes Tauler
 John A. Leslie
 John Abercrombie (physician)
 John Alexander Gunn
 John Alexander Smith
 John Amos Comenius
 John Anderson (philosopher)
 John Argyropoulos
 John Armstrong (British writer/philosopher)
 John Arthur Passmore
 John Austin (legal philosopher)
 John B. Watson
 John Balguy
 John Beatty (philosopher)
 John Beverley Robinson (anarchist)
 John Blund
 John Broadus Watson
 John Broome (philosopher)
 John Bulwer
 John Burnheim
 John Callender (psychiatrist)
 John Calvin
 John Campbell (philosopher)
 John Caputo
 John Carew Eccles
 John Case (Aristotelian writer)
 John Clarke (Dean of Salisbury)
 John Cook Wilson
 John Corcoran (logician)
 John Corvino
 John Cowper Powys
 John Creaghe
 John Damascene
 John Daniel Wild
 John de Sècheville
 John Dee
 John Deely
 John Dewey
 John Dewey Society
 John Dumbleton
 John Duns Scotus
 John Dupré
 John E. Hare
 John E. Thomas
 John Earman
 John Elof Boodin
 John Etchemendy
 John F. X. Knasas
 John Finnis
 John Fiske (philosopher)
 John Fitzgerald (poet)
 John Foster (philosopher)
 John Gay
 John Greco (philosopher)
 John Grote
 John Halgren of Abbeville
 John Haugeland
 John Hawthorne
 John Hennon
 John Henry Bernard
 John Henry Mackay
 John Henry Morgan
 John Henry Muirhead
 John Henry Newman
 John Herman Randall, Jr.
 John Heydon (astrologer)
 John Hick
 John Hoppus
 John Hospers
 John Italus
 John Jamieson Carswell Smart
 John Joseph Haldane
 John Kekes
 John L. Pollock
 John Lachs
 John Laird (philosopher)
 John Lemmon
 John Lennox
 John Levy (philosopher)
 John Lewis (philosopher)
 John Locke
 John Locke Lectures
 John Lucas
 John Lucas (philosopher)
 John M. Dillon
 John Macmurray
 John Macquarrie
 John Maeda
 John Major (philosopher)
 John Major
 John Martin Fischer
 John Maynard Keynes
 John Mbiti
 John McDowell
 John McMurtry
 John McTaggart Ellis McTaggart
 John Millar (philosopher)
 John Milton
 John Moore (anarchist)
 John N. Deck
 John N. Gray
 John Neihardt
 John Niemeyer Findlay
 John Norris (philosopher)
 John of Damascus
 John of Fidanza
 John of Głogów
 John of Jandun
 John of La Rochelle
 John of Mirecourt
 John of Paris
 John of Saint Thomas
 John of Salisbury
 John of St Thomas
 John of St. Thomas
 John Oswald (activist)
 John P. Anton
 John P. Burgess
 John Pagus
 John Passmore
 John Pecham
 John Peckham
 John Perry (philosopher)
 John Philoponus
 John Poinsot
 John Ponce
 John R. Searle
 John R. Steel
 John Rajchman
 John Ralston Saul
 John Raven
 John Rawls
 John Ray
 John Robert Jones
 John Ruskin
 John Russon
 John Sallis
 John Searle
 John Seiler Brubacher
 John Selden
 John Sergeant (priest)
 John Skorupski
 John Smith (Platonist)
 John Stuart Mackenzie
 John Stuart Mill
 John Stuart Mill Institute
 John Tauler
 John the Grammarian
 John Theophilus Desaguliers
 John Toland
 John Turner (anarchist)
 John Veitch (poet)
 John Venn
 John von Neumann
 John Weckert
 John William Miller
 John Wisdom
 John Witherspoon
 John Worrall (philosopher)
 John Wyclif
 John Wycliffe
 John Zerzan
 John Zube
 Joie de vivre
 Joint method of agreement and difference
 Jon Barwise
 Jon Elster
 Jon Hellesnes
 Jon Mandle
 Jonael Schickler
 Jonathan Barnes
 Jonathan Bennett (philosopher)
 Jonathan Dancy
 Jonathan Edwards (theologian)
 Jonathan Edwards (theology)
 Jonathan Glover
 Jonathan Kvanvig
 Jonathan Lear
 Jonathan Lowe
 Jonathan Rée
 Jonathan Schaffer
 Jonathan Wolff (philosopher)
 Jordi Pigem
 Jorge J. E. Gracia
 José Gaos
 José Gil (philosopher)
 José Guilherme Merquior
 José Ingenieros
 Jose Ortega y Gasset
 José Ortega y Gasset
 José Peirats
 José Vasconcelos
 Josef Hoëné-Wronski
 Josef Peukert
 Josef Pieper
 Josef Simon
 Josefina Ayerza
 Josep Lluís i Facerias
 Joseph-Marie de Maistre
 Joseph Addison
 Joseph Agassi
 Joseph Albo
 Joseph Alois Schumpeter
 Joseph B. Soloveitchik
 Joseph ben Judah of Ceuta
 Joseph Beuys
 Joseph Butler
 Joseph Cropsey
 Joseph D. Sneed
 Joseph de Maistre
 Joseph de Torre
 Joseph Déjacque
 Joseph Dietzgen
 Joseph Franz Molitor
 Joseph Frédéric Bérard
 Joseph Glanvill
 Joseph H. H. Weiler
 Joseph Heath
 Joseph Henry Woodger
 Joseph Hilbe
 Joseph J. Spengler
 Joseph Kaspi
 Joseph Kosuth
 Joseph Leon Blau
 Joseph Maréchal
 Joseph Margolis
 Joseph Marie de Maistre
 Joseph Marie, baron de Gérando
 Joseph Morton Ransdell
 Joseph Owens (Redemptorist)
 Joseph Priestley
 Joseph Priestley and Dissent
 Joseph Raz
 Joseph Rovan
 Joseph Runzo
 Joseph Solomon Delmedigo
 Josephus Flavius Cook
 Joshua Cohen (philosopher)
 Joshua Knobe
 Josiah Royce
 Josiah Warren
 Josip Križan
 Journal for General Philosophy of Science
 Journal of Aesthetics and Art Criticism
 Journal of Applied Non-Classical Logics
 Journal of Applied Philosophy
 Journal of Ayn Rand Studies
 Journal of Business Ethics
 Journal of Consciousness Studies
 Journal of Ethics & Social Philosophy
 Journal of Logic, Language and Information
 Journal of Medical Ethics
 Journal of Moral Philosophy
 Journal of Philosophical Logic
 Journal of Philosophy
 Journal of Research Practice
 Journal of Scottish Philosophy
 Journal of the History of Ideas
 Journal of the History of Philosophy
 Journalism ethics and standards
 Journals of Ayn Rand
 Journals of philosophy
 Józef Emanuel Jankowski
 Józef Gołuchowski
 Józef Kalasanty Szaniawski
 Józef Kremer
 Jozef Maria Bochenski
 Józef Maria Bocheński
 Józef Maria Hoene-Wroński
 Józef Tischner
 Józef Życiński
 Ju
 Juan-David Nasio
 Juan Carrasco (apologist)
 Juan Chi
 Juan David García Bacca
 Juan de Dios Filiberto
 Juan de Mariana
 Juan Donoso Cortés
 Juan García Oliver
 Juan Ginés de Sepúlveda
 Juan Luis Vives
 Juan Luís Vives
 Juan Manuel Burgos
 Juan Manuel Guillén
 Juan Nuño
 Juche
 Judah ben Eliezer ha-Levi Minz
 Judah ben Moses of Rome
 Judah ben Moses Romano
 Judah Ben Samuel of Regensburg
 Judah Ha-Levi
 Judah Halevi
 Judah Leon Abravanel
 Judah Messer Leon
 Judah Messer Leon (15th century)
 Judah Romano
 Judaism
 Judea Pearl
 Judeo-Islamic philosophies (800–1400)
 Judge for Yourselves!
 Judgement
 Judgment
 Judgmental language
 Judith Butler
 Judith Jarvis Thomson
 Judith Miller (philosopher)
 Juha Varto
 Jules Barthélemy-Saint-Hilaire
 Jules Bonnot
 Jules de Gaultier
 Jules Henri Poincaré
 Jules Henri Saiset
 Jules Lequier
 Jules Vuillemin
 Julia Annas
 Julia Kristeva
 Julian Baggini
 Julian Gumperz
 Julian Jaynes
 Julián Marías
 Julian Nida-Rümelin
 Julian Ochorowicz
 Julian Savulescu
 Julian the Apostate
 Julie Rivkin
 Julie, or the New Heloise
 Julien Benda
 Julien Offray de La Mettrie
 Julien Offroy de La Mettrie
 Julius Bahnsen
 Julius Binder
 Julius Caesar Scaliger
 Julius Duboc
 Julius Ebbinghaus
 Julius Evola
 Julius Frank
 Julius Frauenstädt
 Julius Guttmann
 Julius Schaller
 Julius Wilhelm Richard Dedekind
 Jun-Hyeok Kwak
 Jung
 Junge Wilde
 Junius Rusticus
 Junzi
 Juozas Girnius
 Jura Books
 Jura federation
 Jürgen Habermas
 Jürgen Mittelstraß
 Jurisdictional arbitrage
 Jurisprudence
 Jury nullification
 Jus ad bellem
 Jus ad bellum
 Jus in bello
 Jus post bellum
 Jus sanguinis
 Jus soli
 Just-world phenomenon
 Just a Couple of Days
 Just in case
 Just price
 Just war
 Just War
 Just war theory
 Justice
 Justice as fairness
 Justice as Fairness
 Justice as Fairness: A Restatement
 Justification
 Justification by faith
 Justification for the state
 Justified true belief
 Justin Leiber
 Justin Martyr
 Justin Oakley
 Justin Popović
 Justinian I
 Justitium
 Justus Lipsius

K 

 K'ang Yu-wei
 K'ung Ch'iu
 K'ung Tzu
 K. J. Popma
 K. N. Jayatilleke
 Kabbalah
 Kabouter
 Kafé 44
 Kai Nielsen (philosopher)
 Kaibara Ekken
 Kala
 Kāla
 Kalam
 Kalam cosmological argument
 Kalos kagathos
 Kalpa (aeon)
 Kammaṭṭhāna
 Kanada
 Kancha Ilaiah
 Kang Youwei
 Kantian ethics
 Kantianism
 Kao Tzu
 Karaism
 Karel Kosík
 Karel Lambert
 Karel Verleye
 Karen Hanson
 Karen J. Warren
 Karen Swassjan
 Karl-Otto Apel
 Karl Albert
 Karl Ameriks
 Karl Barth
 Karl Christian Friedrich Krause
 Karl Christian Planck
 Karl Daub
 Karl Emil Maximilian Weber
 Karl Fortlage
 Karl Heinrich Heydenreich
 Karl Heinrich Marx
 Karl Jaspers
 Karl Joel (philosopher)
 Karl Johann Kautsky
 Karl Joseph Hieronymus Windischmann
 Karl Kautsky
 Karl Korsch
 Karl Kraus
 Karl Leonhard Reinhold
 Karl Loewenstein
 Karl Löwith
 Karl Ludwig Michelet
 Karl Mannheim
 Karl Marx
 Karl Menger
 Karl Olivecrona
 Karl Popper
 Karl Rahner
 Karl Raimund Popper
 Karl Renner
 Karl Robert Eduard von Hartmann
 Karl Theodor Bayrhoffer
 Karl Theodor Jaspers
 Karl von Prantl
 Karl Vorländer
 Karl Wilhelm Ferdinand Solger
 Karl Wilhelm Friedrich Schlegel
 Karl Wilhelm Ramler
 Karl, Freiherr von Prel
 Karma
 Karma in Buddhism
 Karma in Jainism
 Karmic
 Karol Libelt
 Karuṇā
 Kaśmir Śaivism
 Kaspar Schmidt
 Katalepsis
 Katarzyna Jaszczolt
 Kate Sharpley Library
 Kate Soper
 Katharsis
 Kathekon
 Kathleen Higgins
 Kautilya
 Kavka's toxin puzzle
 Kazimierz Ajdukiewicz
 Kazimierz Łyszczyński
 Kazimierz Twardowski
 Keiji Nishitani
 Keith Campbell (philosopher)
 Keith DeRose
 Keith Donnellan
 Keith Lehrer
 Keith Ward
 Keith Yandell
 Ken Wilber
 Kenan Malik
 Kendall Walton
 Kenelm Digby
 Kennedy Institute of Ethics
 Kennedy Institute of Ethics Journal
 Kenneth Allen Taylor
 Kenneth Arrow
 Kenneth Clatterbaugh
 Kenneth Rexroth
 Kennisbank Filosofie Nederland
 Kenoma
 Kensho
 Kent Bach
 Kermit Scott
 Kersey Graves
 Kevala Jnana
 Kevin Carson
 Kevin Mulligan
 Key Ideas in Human Thought
 Khaldūn
 Khen Lampert
 Khôra
 Kieron O'Hara
 Killing Time (Paul Feyerabend book)
 Kim Jwa-jin
 Kim Sterelny
 Kin selection
 Kind
 Kindness
 Kinesis
 Kinetic art
 Kinetic theory
 Kingdom of Ends
 Kit Fine
 Kitāb al-Hayawān (Aristotle)
 Kitabatake Chikafusa
 Kitaro Nishida
 Kitsch
 Kiyoshi Miki
 KK thesis
 Klaus Klostermaier
 Klement Jug
 Knight of faith
 Knightly Virtues
 Know thyself
 Knower paradox
 Knowledge
 Knowledge acquisition
 Knowledge and Its Limits
 Knowledge by acquaintance
 Knowledge by description
 Knowledge of Angels
 Knowledge relativity
 Knud Ejler Løgstrup
 Kohlberg's stages of moral development
 Kojin Karatani
 Kokoro
 Kol HaTor
 Konstantin Aksakov
 Konstantin Chkheidze
 Konstantin Kavelin
 Konstantin Leontiev
 Konstantin Pobedonostsev
 Konstantinos Michail
 Konstanty Michalski
 Korean philosophy
 Kosha
 Kostas Axelos
 Kosuke Koyama
 Krastyo Krastev
 Angelika Krebs
 Kripke semantics
 Krishna Chandra Bhattacharya
 Kronstadt rebellion
 Krystyn Lach Szyrma
 Krzysztof Pomian
 Ksenija Atanasijević
 Kūkai
 Kuki Shūzō
 Kumārajīva
 Kumārila Bhaṭṭa
 Kumazawa Banzan
 Kung
 Kung-sun Lung Tzu
 Kung Fu-tzu
 Kuno Fischer
 Kuno Lorenz
 Kunstreligion
 Kuo Hsiang
 Kuroda Kan'ichi
 Kuroda normal form
 Kurt Almqvist
 Kurt Baier
 Kurt Gödel
 Kurt Gödel Society
 Kurt Grelling
 Kurt Lewin
 Kurt Riezler
 Kurt Rudolf Fischer
 Kurt Singer
 Kurt Sternberg
 Kuzari
 Kwame Anthony Appiah
 Kwame Gyekye
 Kwame Nkrumah
 Kwasi Wiredu
 Kwon Geun
 Kyklos
 Kyle Stanford
 Kyoto school

L 

 L'Abécédaire de Gilles Deleuze
 L'Arco e la Clava
 L'En-Dehors
 L'existentialisme est un humanisme
 L'expérience intérieure
 L. Susan Brown
 L. T. F. Gamut
 L. W. Sumner
 La Part maudite
 La Peau de chagrin
 La Riposte
 Labadie Collection
 Labor aristocracy
 Labor theory of property
 Labour power
 Lacan at the Scene
 Laches (dialogue)
 Lacydes of Cyrene
 Ladislav Klíma
 Lady Masham
 Laelius de Amicitia
 Lai Zhide
 Laïcité
 Lakatos Award
 Lambda calculus
 Lambert of Auxerre
 Lambertus de Monte
 Land ethic
 Landless Peoples Movement
 Landless Workers' Movement
 Language
 Language-game
 Language and thought
 Language equation
 Language game
 Language identification in the limit
 Language of thought
 Language of thought hypothesis
 Language, Truth, and Logic
 Languages of Art
 Lanza del Vasto
 Laozi
 Laplace's demon
 Larry Laudan
 Larry Sanger
 Lars-Henrik Schmidt
 Lars Gule
 Last man
 Lastheneia of Mantinea
 Late modernism
 Lateral thinking
 Latin Conservatism
 Latitudinarianism
 Latitudinarianism (philosophy)
 Lattice theory
 Laughter
 Laughter (Bergson)
 Laura Kipnis
 Laurence BonJour
 Laurence Jonathan Cohen
 Laurence Lampert
 Laurens Perseus Hickok
 Laurent Tailhade
 Law
 Law (principle)
 Law as integrity
 Law in action
 Law of accumulation
 Law of attraction (New Thought)
 Law of contraries
 Law of double negation
 Law of excluded middle
 Law of identity
 Law of large numbers
 Law of nature
 Law of non-contradiction
 Law of succession
 Law of the Infinite Cornucopia
 Law of thought
 Law of trichotomy
 Law of Unintended Consequences
 Law of value
 Law, Legislation and Liberty
 Lawrence C. Becker
 Lawrence Ferlinghetti
 Lawrence Jarach
 Lawrence Kohlberg
 Lawrence Sklar
 Lawrence Stepelevich
 Lawrence Storione
 Laws (dialogue)
 Laws of Form
 Laws of nature
 Laws of thought
 Lazarus Geiger
 Laziness
 Lazy argument
 Lazy Reason
 Le Ton beau de Marot
 Leadership
 League of peace
 Leap of faith
 Learned Hand
 Learning
 Least squares method
 Lebensphilosophie
 Lebenswelt
 Lectures on Aesthetics
 Lectures on the Philosophy of Religion
 Lectures on the History of Philosophy
 Lectures on the Philosophy of History
 Lee Carroll
 Leemon McHenry
 Left communism
 Left quotient
 Left recursion
 Left SR uprising
 Legal code (municipal)
 Legal concept
 Legal death
 Legal Education and the Reproduction of Hierarchy
 Legal ethics
 Legal formalism
 Legal interpretation
 Legal liability
 Legal malpractice
 Legal moralism
 Legal naturalism
 Legal origins theory
 Legal philosophy
 Legal positivism
 Legal principle
 Legal realism
 Legal right
 Legal rights
 Legal science
 Legalism
 Legalism (Chinese philosophy)
 Legalism (Western philosophy)
 Legisign
 Legitimacy (political)
 Legitimists (disambiguation)
 Leibniz's gap
 Leibniz's law
 Leibniz–Clarke correspondence
 Lelio Basso
 Lemma (logic)
 Lemma (mathematics)
 Leninism
 Lennart Åqvist
 Leo Apostel
 Léo Ferré
 Leo Harrington
 Leo Kofler
 Leo Kuper
 Leo Mikhailovich Lopatin
 Leo Strauss
 Leo the Mathematician
 Leo Tolstoy
 Leo Tolstoy bibliography
 Leon Battista Alberti
 Léon Brunschvicg
 Leon Chwistek
 Leon Czolgosz
 Léon Dumont
 Leon Henkin
 Léon Ollé-Laprune
 Leon Petrazycki
 Leon Petrażycki
 Leon Trotsky
 Leonard B. Meyer
 Leonard Borgzinner
 Leonard Harris (philosopher)
 Leonard Linsky
 Leonard Nelson
 Leonard Peikoff
 Leonard Read
 Leonard Trelawny Hobhouse
 Leonardo da Vinci
 Leonardo Garzoni
 Leonardo Moledo
 Leonardo Polo
 Léonce Crenier
 Leonid Grinin
 Leonid Pitamic
 Leonid Stolovich
 Leonidas Donskis
 Leonteus of Lampsacus
 Leontion
 Leopold Flam
 Leopold Kronecker
 Leopold Löwenheim
 Leopoldo Zea Aguilar
 Les Automatistes
 Les jeux sont faits
 Les Nabis
 Les Temps modernes
 Lesbian feminism
 Leslie Armour
 Leslie Green (philosopher)
 Leslie Stephen
 Letter to a Christian Nation
 Letters of Ayn Rand
 Letters of Insurgents
 Letters to a Philosophical Unbeliever
 Letters to Malcolm: Chiefly on Prayer
 Lettre sur les aveugles à l'usage de ceux qui voient
 Lettrism
 Leucippus
 Lev Chernyi
 Lev Semenovich Vygotskii
 Lev Semënovich Vygotskii
 Lev Semenovich Vygotsky
 Lev Shestov
 Lev Vygotskii
 Lev Vygotsky
 Level
 Levels of adequacy
 Levels of Knowing and Existence
 Levi ben Gershom
 Levi Hedge
 Leviathan (book)
 Leviathan and the Air-Pump
 Lew Rockwell
 Lewis's trilemma
 Lewis Call
 Lewis Carroll
 Lewis Gordon
 Lewis Mumford
 Lewis White Beck
 LewRockwell.com
 Lex talionis
 Lex, Rex
 Lexical ambiguity
 Lexical definition
 Lexicology
 Lexicon
 Lexington Avenue bombing
 Lexis (Aristotle)
 LF (logical framework)
 LGBT topics and Confucianism
 Li
 Li (Confucian)
 Li (Neo-Confucianism)
 Li Ao
 Li Ao (philosopher)
 Li Chi
 Li Kui (legalist)
 Li Shenzhi
 Li Shicen
 Li Si
 Li Zhi (philosopher)
 Liang Ch'i-ch'ao
 Liang Qichao
 Liang Shuming
 Liar paradox
 Liber de Causis
 Liberal arts
 Liberal conservatism
 Liberal eugenics
 Liberal movements within Islam
 Liberal nationalism
 Liberal paradox
 Liberalism
 Liberalism in Canada
 Liberalism worldwide
 Liberation theology
 Libero International
 Libertarian League
 Libertarian Marxism
 Libertarian municipalism
 Libertarian perspectives on revolution
 Libertarian socialism
 Libertarian theories of law
 Libertarian transhumanism
 Libertarian Workers' Group
 Libertarianism
 Libertarianism (metaphysics)
 Libertarianism (philosophy)
 Libertarianism (politics)
 Libertarias
 Liberté, égalité, fraternité
 Libertinism
 Liberty
 Liberty right
 Liberum arbitrium
 Library of Friedrich Nietzsche
 Library of Living Philosophers
 Lie
 Lie Yukou
 Liezi
 Life
 Life-world
 Life and death
 Life and Labor Commune
 Life course theory
 Life imitating art
 Life is a Dream
 Life Is Real Only Then, When 'I Am'
 Life of Apollonius of Tyana
 Life of Jesus (Hegel)
 Life of Pi
 Life stance
 Lifeboat ethics
 Lifestyle (sociology)
 Lifestyle anarchism
 Lifeworld
 Light of nature
 Lightness (philosophy)
 Likkutei Sichos
 Lila: An Inquiry into Morals
 Lilian Wolfe
 Lilli Alanen
 Limbo
 Limit-experience
 Limited Inc
 Lin-chi
 Lin Yutang
 Linacre Quarterly
 Linda Martín Alcoff
 Linda Trinkaus Zagzebski
 Lindley Darden
 Line of Beauty
 Line of flight
 Lineage (Buddhism)
 Linear grammar
 Linear logic
 Linear order
 Linguistic analysis
 Linguistic competence
 Linguistic determinism
 Linguistic discrimination
 Linguistic performance
 Linguistic philosophy
 Linguistic relativity
 Linguistic semantics
 Linguistic turn
 Linguistics and Philosophy
 Linji Yixuan
 List of aestheticians
 List of African American philosophers
 List of American philosophers
 List of anarchist books
 List of anarchist communities
 List of anarchist movements by region
 List of anarchist musicians
 List of anarchist organizations
 List of anarchist periodicals
 List of anarchist poets
 List of anarcho-punk bands
 List of ancient Greek philosophers
 List of ancient Platonists
 List of Argentine philosophers
 List of Armenian scientists and philosophers
 List of books about philosophy
 List of British philosophers
 List of Canadian philosophers
 List of Catholic philosophers and theologians
 List of Chinese philosophers
 List of cognitive biases
 List of communist ideologies
 List of communist parties
 List of Confucianists
 List of contributors to Marxist theory
 List of critical theorists
 List of culturally linked qualities of music
 List of current communist states
 List of Cynic philosophers
 List of environmental philosophers
 List of Epicurean philosophers
 List of epistemologists
 List of ethicists
 List of ethics topics
 List of existentialists
 List of fallacies
 List of female mystics
 List of female philosophers
 List of fictional anarchists
 List of French artistic movements
 List of French philosophers
 List of German-language philosophers
 List of humanism topics
 List of humanists
 List of Iranian philosophers
 List of Italian philosophers
 List of Jewish American philosophers
 List of Jewish anarchists
 List of Jewish scientists and philosophers
 List of Korean philosophers
 List of Latin phrases (A–E)
 List of logicians
 List of metaphysicians
 List of Muslim philosophers
 List of Nazi ideologues
 List of new religious movements
 List of nontheists (philosophy)
 List of Pakistani scientists and philosophers
 List of paradoxes
 List of philosophers
 List of philosophers (A–C)
 List of philosophers (D–H)
 List of philosophers (I–Q)
 List of philosophers (R–Z)
 List of philosophers born in the centuries BC
 List of philosophers born in the eighteenth century
 List of philosophers born in the eleventh through fourteenth centuries
 List of philosophers born in the fifteenth and sixteenth centuries
 List of philosophers born in the first through tenth centuries
 List of philosophers born in the nineteenth century
 List of philosophers born in the seventeenth century
 List of philosophers born in the twentieth century
 List of philosophers of language
 List of philosophers of mind
 List of philosophers of science
 List of philosophical topics
 List of philosophies
 List of philosophy anniversaries
 List of philosophy journals
 List of political philosophers
 List of postmodern critics
 List of rasa'il in the Encyclopedia of the Brethren of Purity
 List of Renaissance commentators on Aristotle
 List of Renaissance humanists
 List of Romanian philosophers
 List of rules of inference
 List of Russian anarchists
 List of Russian philosophers
 List of scholastic philosophers
 List of schools of philosophy
 List of Slovenian philosophers
 List of social and political philosophers
 List of speakers in Plato's dialogues
 List of Stoic philosophers
 List of teachers of Advaita Vedanta
 List of thinkers influenced by deconstruction
 List of thought processes
 List of topics in philosophical aesthetics
 List of topics in sexual ethics
 List of Turkish philosophers
 List of Turkish philosophers and scientists
 List of utilitarians
 List of works about Friedrich Nietzsche
 List of works by Joseph Priestley
 List of works by Lucian
 List of works in critical theory
 List of writers influenced by Aristotle
 List of years in philosophy
 Listen, Anarchist!
 Lists of anarchism topics
 Lists of philosophers
 Lists of philosophy topics
 Literal meaning
 Literary criticism
 Literary merit
 Literary theory
 Littoral art
 Liu Boming (philosopher)
 Liu Bowen
 Liu Shao-ch'i
 Liu Shifu
 Liu Xie
 Lived body
 Lives and Opinions of Eminent Philosophers
 Living Ethics
 Living Garment of God
 Living High and Letting Die
 Living Marxism
 Living My Life
 Ljubomir Cuculovski
 Loaded question
 Löb's theorem
 Local skepticism
 Localism (politics)
 Locke's Socks
 Locutionary act
 Locutions
 Logic
 Logic alphabet
 Logic as a Positive Science
 Logic diagram
 Logic in China
 Logic in computer science
 Logic in Islamic philosophy
 Logic Made Easy
 Logic of information
 Logic redundancy
 Logic Spectacles
 Logica nova
 Logica Universalis
 Logical argument
 Logical atomism
 Logical biconditional
 Logical certainty
 Logical connective
 Logical consequence
 Logical constant
 Logical constants
 Logical disjunction
 Logical empiricism
 Logical equality
 Logical equivalence
 Logical extreme
 Logical form
 Logical graph
 Logical harmony
 Logical holism
 Logical implication
 Logical independence
 Logical matrix
 Logical necessity
 Logical NOR
 Logical paradox
 Logical positivism
 Logical Positivism
 Logical possibility
 Logical predicate
 Logical quality
 Logical reasoning
 Logical symbols
 Logical syntax
 Logical system
 Logical theory
 Logical truth
 Logicism
 Logicomix
 Logics
 Logocentric
 Logocentrism
 Logoi
 Logorrhoea (linguistics)
 Logos
 Logos: A Journal of Modern Society and Culture
 Logosophy
 Lon L. Fuller
 London Action Resource Centre
 London Autonomists
 London Positivist Society
 Lonergan Institute
 Longchenpa
 Longinus
 Longinus (literature)
 Looking Backward
 Lookism
 Lopamudra
 Lord Kames
 Lord Monboddo
 Lord Shaftesbury
 Lord Shang
 Loren Eiseley
 Loren Lomasky
 Lorenz Oken
 Lorenzo Magalotti
 Lorenzo Magnani
 Lorenzo Peña
 Lorenzo Valla
 Los Solidarios
 Loss aversion
 Lottery of birth
 Lottery paradox
 Lou Marinoff
 Louis-Françisque Lélut
 Louis Althusser
 Louis Billot
 Louis Claude de Saint-Martin
 Louis Couturat
 Louis Dupré
 Louis Eugène Marie Bautain
 Louis Gabriel Ambroise de Bonald
 Louis H. Mackey
 Louis Lavelle
 Louis Narens
 Louis Pojman
 Louis Rougier
 Louise Berger
 Louise Bryant
 Louise Michel
 Love
 Lovefeast
 Lowenfield v. Phelps
 Löwenheim–Skolem theorem
 Loyalty
 Lu-shih ch'un-ch'iu
 Lü-shih ch'un-ch'iu
 Lu Ban
 Lu Hsiang-shan
 Lu Jiuyuan
 Lü Liuliang
 Lu Xiangshan
 Luc Bovens
 Luc de Clapiers, marquis de Vauvenargues
 Luc Ferry
 Luce Irigaray
 Lucía Sánchez Saornil
 Lucian
 Lucian Blaga
 Lucian Floridi
 Lucian of Samosata
 Luciano Floridi
 Lucien Goldmann
 Lucien Lévy-Bruhl
 Lucifer the Lightbearer
 Lucilio Vanini
 Lucio Colletti
 Lucio Urtubia
 Lucius Annaeus Cornutus
 Lucius Annaeus Seneca
 Luck
 Lucretius
 Lucy Parsons
 Luddite
 Ludic
 Ludic fallacy
 Ludovico Geymonat
 Ludwig Feuerbach
 Ludwig Babenstuber
 Ludwig Boltzmann
 Ludwig Büchner
 Ludwig Klages
 Ludwig Landgrebe
 Ludwig Marcuse
 Ludwig Tieck
 Ludwig von Mises
 Ludwig Wittgenstein
 Ludwik Fleck
 Luigi Fabbri
 Luigi Ferri
 Luigi Galleani
 Luigi Guido Grandi
 Luigi Lucheni
 Luigi Pareyson
 Luis de Molina
 Luís Filipe Teixeira
 Luisa Capetillo
 Luitzen Egbertus Jan Brouwer
 Luminism (American art style)
 Lun Yu
 Lunheng
 Lunyu
 Luo Rufang
 Lương Kim Định
 Lüshi Chunqiu
 Lust
 Lutheran scholasticism
 Lutz Wingert
 Luxemburgism
 Lwów–Warsaw school
 Lyceum
 Lyceum (classical)
 Lyco of Iasos
 Lyco of Troas
 Lycophron (sophist)
 Lying
 Lynn Pasquerella
 Lynne Rudder Baker
 Lyrical abstraction
 Lysander Spooner
 Lysis (dialogue)
 Lysis of Taras
 Lyubomir Ivanov (explorer)
 Lyubov Axelrod

M 

 M. Nasroen
 Ma Rong
 Mach's principle
 Machiavellianism
 Macrocosm
 Macrocosm and microcosm
 Mad pain and Martian pain
 Madame de Stael
 Madame de Staël
 Madeleine Doran
 Madhava
 Madhusūdana Sarasvatī
 Madhvacharya
 Madhwas
 Madhyamaka
 Madhyamika
 Mādhyamika
 Madhyamika Buddhism
 Mādhyamika Buddhism
 Magdalena Środa
 Magical thinking
 Magna Moralia
 Magnanimity
 Magnificence (History of ideas)
 Mahabharata
 Mahābhūta
 Mahamudra
 Mahasi Sayadaw
 Mahatma Gandhi
 Mahavira
 Mahayana
 Mahayana Buddhism
 Mahmoud Khatami
 Maieutics
 Maimonides
 Maine de Biran
 Maitreya-nātha
 Maitreyi
 Major term
 Makapansgat pebble
 Makhnovshchina
 Maksim Rayevsky
 Malakia
 Malcolm Knox
 Malinda Cramer
 Malthusian catastrophe
 Malthusian equilibrium
 Man's Fate
 Man's inhumanity to man
 Man a Machine
 Man and Society
 Man and Technics
 Manas-vijnana
 Manchester Literary and Philosophical Society
 Mandala
 Maṇḍana Miśra
 Mandate of Heaven
 Mandated choice
 Mandeville's paradox
 Manfred Frank
 Mani
 Mani Kaul
 Manichaeism
 Manicheanism
 Manifesto of the Sixteen
 Manifold
 Manlio Sgalambro
 Mannerism
 Mantra
 Manuchehr Jamali
 Manuel Buenacasa Tomeo
 Manuel Chrysoloras
 Manuel de Landa
 Manuel Lassala
 Manuel Sacristán
 Many-minds interpretation
 Many-valued logic
 Many-valued logics
 Many-worlds interpretation of quantum mechanics
 Manzoor Ahmad
 Mao Zedong
 Maoism
 Map–territory relation
 Mappō
 Marburg School
 Marc-Alain Ouaknin
 Marc de Vries
 Marc Jean-Bernard
 Marc Sautet
 Marcantonio Genua
 Marcel Conche
 Marcel Gauchet
 Marcello Pera
 Marcelo Dascal
 Marcelo Sánchez Sorondo
 Marco Camenisch
 Marcus Aurelius
 Marcus Favonius
 Marcus George Singer
 Marcus Minucius Felix
 Marcus Musurus
 Marek Siemek
 Margaret Canovan
 Margaret Cavendish, Duchess of Newcastle-upon-Tyne
 Margaret Elizabeth Egan
 Margaret Gilbert
 Margaret Somerville
 Margareta i Kumla
 Marginal utility
 Marginalization
 Maria Gaetana Agnesi
 Maria Montessori
 Maria Nikiforova
 Maria Occhipinti
 Maria Ossowska
 María Zambrano
 Maria: or, The Wrongs of Woman
 Marian Hillar
 Marian Jaworski
 Marian Massonius
 Marian Zdziechowski
 Marianna Marquesa Florenzi
 Mariano Artigas
 Marie-Louise Berneri
 Marie Equi
 Marilena Chaui
 Marilyn Frye
 Marilyn McCord Adams
 Marin Mersenne
 Marinus of Neapolis
 Mario Bettinus
 Mario Bunge
 Mario De Caro
 Mario Kopić
 Mario Perniola
 Marius the Epicurean
 Marius Victorinus
 Marjorie Grene
 Mark Addis
 Mark Alan Walker
 Mark C. Taylor
 Mark Cherry
 Mark de Bretton Platts
 Mark Johnson (philosopher)
 Mark Kingwell
 Mark Kuczewski
 Mark Lance
 Mark Olssen
 Mark Philp
 Mark Sacks
 Mark Sainsbury (philosopher)
 Mark Sainsbury (philosopher)
 Mark Steiner
 Mark Vernon
 Mark Wrathall
 Market populism
 Market socialism
 Marketing ethics
 Markov process
 Markus Herz
 Marlène Zarader
 Marpa Lotsawa
 Marquis de Condorcet
 Marriage
 Marshall Berman
 Marshall McLuhan
 Marsiglio of Padua
 Marsilio dei Mainardine
 Marsilio Ficino
 Marsilius of Inghen
 Marsilius of Padua
 Marta Petreu
 Martha C. Nussbaum
 Martha Craven Nussbaum
 Martha Klein
 Martha Nussbaum
 Martial Guéroult
 Martian scientist
 Martin A. Hainz
 Martin Buber
 Martin Davis
 Martin Deutinger
 Martin Gardner
 Martin Heidegger
 Martin Hollis (philosopher)
 Martin Knutzen
 Martin Kusch
 Martin Löb
 Martin Luther
 Martin Luther King Jr.
 Martin Stokhof
 Martin van Hees
 Martine Batchelor
 Martinus Smiglecius
 Martyn Evans (academic)
 Marvin Farber
 Marvin Minsky
 Marx's Historical Stages
 Marx's theory of alienation
 Marx's theory of history
 Marx's theory of human nature
 Marx W. Wartofsky
 Marx’s method
 Marxism
 Marxism–Leninism
 Marxist aesthetics
 Marxist feminism
 Marxist humanism
 Marxist philosophy
 Marxist philosophy of nature
 Marxist sociology
 Mary's room
 Mary Anne Atwood
 Mary Anne Warren
 Mary Astell
 Mary Daly
 Mary Hesse
 Mary Louise Pratt
 Mary Midgley
 Mary Tiles
 Mary Warnock
 Mary Warnock, Baroness Warnock
 Mary Whiton Calkins
 Mary Wollstonecraft
 Masakazu Nakai
 Masao Abe
 Masculism
 Masked-man fallacy
 Mass noun
 Massimo Cacciari
 Massimo Pigliucci
 Master-slave dialectic
 Master-slave morality
 Master argument
 Master suppression techniques
 Mateo Aimerich
 Material conditional
 Material equivalence
 Material good
 Material implication
 Material monism
 Material nonimplication
 Material substratum
 Materialism
 Materialism and Empirio-criticism
 Mateu Morral
 Mathematical analysis
 Mathematical beauty
 Mathematical constructivism
 Mathematical fallacy
 Mathematical function
 Mathematical induction
 Mathematical intuitionism
 Mathematical logic
 Mathematical Proceedings of the Cambridge Philosophical Society
 Mathematical space
 Mathematical universe hypothesis
 Mathematics and art
 Matheolus Perusinus
 Mathesis universalis
 Matrix grammar
 Matrix mechanics
 Matteo Campani-Alimenis
 Matteotti Battalion
 Matter
 Matter (philosophy)
 Matter and Memory
 Matthew Ferchi
 Matthew Foreman
 Matthew Lipman
 Matthew of Aquasparta
 Matthew Stewart (philosopher)
 Matthew Tindal
 Matti Häyry
 Maurice Blanchot
 Maurice Blondel
 Maurice Brinton
 Maurice Cranston
 Maurice De Wulf
 Maurice Halbwachs
 Maurice Merleau-Ponty
 Maurice Pradines
 Mauricio Suarez
 Max Baginski
 Max Bense
 Max Black
 Max Dessoir
 Max Hödel
 Max Horkheimer
 Max More
 Max Müller
 Max Müller (Catholic intellectual)
 Max Planck
 Max Scheler
 Max Scheler's Concept of Ressentiment
 Max Stirner
 Max Weber
 Max Weismann
 Maxence Caron
 Maxim (philosophy)
 Maximal consistent set
 Maximalism
 Maximilien Luce
 Maximinus (Praetorian Prefect)
 Maximus of Ephesus
 Maximus of Tyre
 Maximus the Confessor
 Maxine Greene
 Maxwell's demon
 May 68, Philosophy is in the Street!
 Maya (illusion)
 Maya Keyes
 Mayatita
 Mazdak
 Mazen Asfour
 Mazu Daoyi
 Meaning
 Meaning (existential)
 Meaning (linguistics)
 Meaning (non-linguistic)
 Meaning (philosophy of language)
 Meaning (semiotics)
 Meaning of life
 Meaning of life (philosophy)
 Meaning postulate
 Meaningless statement
 Means to an end
 Measurement
 Measurement in quantum mechanics
 Mechanics
 Mechanics (Aristotle)
 Mechanism (philosophy)
 Media accountability
 Media ecology
 Media ethics
 Media transparency
 Mediated reference theory
 Mediation (Marxist theory and media studies)
 Medical error
 Medical ethics
 Medical gaze
 Medical torture
 Medical waste
 Medieval logic
 Medieval philosophy
 Medieval science
 Mediocrity principle
 Meditations
 Meditations on First Philosophy
 Meditations on the Peaks
 Meera Nanda
 Megalothymia and Isothymia
 Megarian school
 Megarians
 Mehdi Belhaj Kacem
 Mehmet Aydın
 Meiklejohnian absolutism
 Meinong's jungle
 Meister Eckhart
 Mel Bradford
 Melbourne School of Continental Philosophy
 Melchiorre Gioia
 Melchor Rodríguez García
 Meleager of Gadara
 Meletus
 Meliorism
 Melissus
 Melissus of Samos
 Melville Y. Stewart
 Meme
 Meme pool
 Memeplex
 Memetics
 Memoirs Illustrating the History of Jacobinism
 Memoirs of Emma Courtney
 Memorabilia (Xenophon)
 Memory
 Men's rights
 Men Among the Ruins
 Mencius
 Mencius (book)
 Mendelian genetics
 Menedemus
 Menedemus of Pyrrha
 Menedemus the Cynic
 Menexenus (dialogue)
 Meng-tzu
 Meng K'o
 Mengzi
 Menippus
 Meno
 Mens rea
 Mental body
 Mental causation
 Mental event
 Mental functions
 Mental illness
 Mental image
 Mental imagery
 Mental process
 Mental property
 Mental representation
 Mental space
 Mental state
 Mental substance
 Mental world
 Mentalese
 Mentalism (philosophy)
 Mentality
 Menyhért Palágyi
 Meontology
 Merab Mamardashvili
 Mercy
 Mere addition paradox
 Mereological essentialism
 Mereological nihilism
 Mereology
 Mereotopology
 Merit
 Merit (Buddhism)
 Meritarian
 Meritocracy
 Merton School
 Meshico
 Mesillat Yesharim
 Message from the East
 Messianic democracy
 Messianism
 Messius Phoebus Severus
 Meta
 Meta-discussion
 Meta-emotion
 Meta-epistemology
 Meta-ethics
 Meta-ontology
 Meta-philosophy
 Meta-rights
 Metadiscourse
 Metaethics
 Metaknowledge
 Metakosmia
 Metal Gear Solid 3: Snake Eater
 Metalanguage
 Metalogic
 Metamagical Themas
 Metamathematics
 Metameme
 Metametaphysics
 Metaphilosophy
 Metaphor
 Metaphor in philosophy
 Metaphor of the sun
 Metaphysical art
 Metaphysical Foundations of Natural Science
 Metaphysical naturalism
 Metaphysical necessity
 Metaphysical nihilism
 Metaphysical objectivism
 Metaphysical poets
 Metaphysical realism
 Metaphysical Society
 Metaphysical solipsism
 Metaphysical subjectivism
 Metaphysics
 Metaphysics (Aristotle)
 Metaphysics of Morals
 Metaphysics of presence
 Metaphysics of quality
 Metaphysics of War
 Metarealism
 Metasyntax
 Metatheorem
 Metatheory
 Metaxy
 Metempsychosis
 Meteorology (Aristotle)
 Method of agreement
 Method of concomitant variations
 Method of residues
 Methodic doubt
 Methodical culturalism
 Methodios Anthrakites
 Methodism
 Methodism (philosophy)
 Methodological individualism
 Methodological naturalism
 Methodological relativism
 Methodological skepticism
 Methodological solipsism
 Methodology
 Methods of obtaining knowledge
 Metrocles
 Metrodorus of Athens
 Metrodorus of Chios
 Metrodorus of Cos
 Metrodorus of Lampsacus (the elder)
 Metrodorus of Lampsacus (the younger)
 Metrodorus of Stratonicea
 Mexican Liberal Party
 Michael A. E. Dummett
 Michael A. Smith
 Michael Anthony Eardley Dummett
 Michael Bratman
 Michael Davis (philosopher)
 Michael Devitt
 Michael Dummett
 Michael E. Rosen
 Michael E. Zimmerman (philosopher)
 Michael Ferejohn
 Michael Foster (philosopher)
 Michael Fourman
 Michael Frede
 Michael Friedman (philosopher)
 Michael Gelven
 Michael Gottlieb Birckner
 Michael Hardt
 Michael Hissmann
 Michael Ignatieff
 Michael Joseph Oakeshott
 Michael Levin
 Michael Lockwood (philosopher)
 Michael Lynch (philosopher)
 Michael Martin (philosopher)
 Michael Matteson
 Michael Neumann
 Michael Novak
 Michael O. Rabin
 Michael Oakeshott
 Michael of Ephesus
 Michael of Massa
 Michael Otsuka
 Michael Polanyi
 Michael Psellos
 Michael R. Ayers
 Michael Ruse
 Michael Sandel
 Michael Schmidt-Salomon
 Michael Scriven
 Michael Sprinker
 Michael Talbot (author)
 Michael Tye (philosopher)
 Michael Vavrus
 Michael Walzer
 Michael Williams (philosopher)
 Michał Falkener
 Michał Heller
 Michał Sędziwój
 Michał Twaróg of Bystrzyków
 Michał Wiszniewski
 Michel Bitbol
 Michel de Certeau
 Michel de Montaigne
 Michel Eyquem de Montaigne
 Michel Fattal
 Michel Foucault
 Michel Foucault bibliography
 Michel Henry
 Michel Onfray
 Michel Pêcheux
 Michel Serres
 Michel Seymour
 Michelangelo Fardella
 Michele Cianciulli
 Michele Le Doeuff
 Michèle Le Doeuff
 Michèle Le Dœuff
 Microcosm
 Middle knowledge
 Middle Platonism
 Middle term
 Middle Way
 Midrash
 Midwest Studies in Philosophy
 Might Is Right
 Might makes right
 Miguel de Unamuno
 Miguel de Unamuno y Jugo
 Miguel García (anarchist)
 Miguel García Vivancos
 Miguel Larreynaga
 Miguel Reale
 Miguel Serrano
 Mihailo Đurić
 Mihailo Marković
 Mikael Stenmark
 Mike Lesser
 Mike Sandbothe
 Mikel Dufrenne
 Mikelis Avlichos
 Mikhail Bakhtin
 Mikhail Bakunin
 Mikhail Lifshitz
 Mikhail Ovsyannikov
 Mikhail Shcherbatov
 Miki Kiyoshi
 Mikyo Dorje
 Mikyö Dorje
 Milan Damnjanović (philosopher)
 Milan Kangrga
 Milan Komar
 Milan Vidmar
 Milarepa
 Milesian school
 Milgram experiment
 Military medical ethics
 Mill's methods
 Mill's Methods
 Millan Puelles
 Milly Witkop
 Mimamsa
 Mimāṃsā
 Mimesis
 Minarchism
 Mind
 Mind's eye
 Mind-body problem
 Mind–body dichotomy
 Mind & Language
 Mind (journal)
 Mind children
 Mind extension
 Mind over matter
 Minds, Machines and Gödel
 Mindset
 Mindstream
 Ming Dynasty
 Mingei
 Minima Moralia
 Minimal decency
 Minimalism
 Minimax
 Minimax strategy
 Minimum Intelligent Signal Test
 Minimum programme
 Minkowski space-time
 Minor premise
 Minor term
 Minority (philosophy)
 Minors and abortion
 Minos (dialogue)
 Mir Damad
 Mir Fendereski
 Miracle
 Miracle of the roses
 Miran Božovič
 Miranda Fricker
 Mircea Eliade
 Mircea Eliade bibliography
 Mirosław Dzielski
 Mirror stage
 Mirror test
 Misanthropy
 Misinformation effect
 Miskawayh
 Misleading vividness
 Misology
 Misopogon
 Misotheism
 Mitchell Miller (philosopher)
 Mitchell Thomashow
 Miura Baien
 Miyabi
 Mladen Dolar
 Mnason of Phocis
 Mnesarchus of Athens
 Mo Ti
 Mo Tzu
 Mochus
 Modal fictionalism
 Modal logic
 Modal operator
 Modal property
 Modal realism
 Modalities (sociology)
 Modality
 Mode of production
 Model (abstract)
 Model theory
 Models of scientific inquiry
 Moderate objectivism
 Moderate realism
 Moderation
 Moderatus of Gades
 Modern liberalism in the United States
 Modern Moral Philosophy
 Modern philosophy
 Modern Physics and Ancient Faith
 Modern School (United States)
 Modernism
 Modernity
 Modesty
 Modistae
 Modjtaba Sadria
 Modor
 Modular constructivism
 Modularity
 Modularity of mind
 Modus ponendo tollens
 Modus ponens
 Modus tollendo ponens
 Modus tollens
 Mohamed Osman Elkhosht
 Mohammad Baqir al-Sadr
 Mohammad Ibn Abd-al-Haq Ibn Sab’in
 Mohammad Taghi Jafari
 Mohammed Abed al-Jabri
 Mohammed Aziz Lahbabi
 Mohammed Chaouki Zine
 Mohammed Sabila
 Mohandas Karamchand Gandhi
 Mohism
 Mohist philosophy
 Mohist School
 Moishe Tokar
 Mojżesz Presburger
 Moksa (Jainism)
 Moksha
 Molecular biology
 Molinism
 Molyneux's Problem
 Molyneux problem
 Molyneux question
 Monad
 Monad (Greek philosophy)
 Monadic predicate calculus
 Monadology
 Monarchomachs
 Monetary reform
 Monimus
 Monism
 Monistic idealism
 Monopoly on violence
 Monotheism
 Monotonic
 Monroe Beardsley
 Montague grammar
 Montanism
 Montanus
 Monte Carlo fallacy
 Montesquieu
 Monty Hall problem
 Mood (psychology)
 Moore's paradox
 Moore reduction procedure
 Moral
 Moral absolutism
 Moral agency
 Moral agent
 Moral agents
 Moral certainty
 Moral character
 Moral community
 Moral core
 Moral development
 Moral dilemma
 Moral dilemmas
 Moral economy
 Moral education
 Moral epistemology
 Moral equivalence
 Moral evil
 Moral example
 Moral hazard
 Moral hierarchy
 Moral high ground
 Moral imperative
 Moral judgment
 Moral law
 Moral luck
 Moral motivation
 Moral nihilism
 Moral non-naturalism
 Moral objectivism
 Moral obligation
 Moral panic
 Moral particularism
 Moral perception
 Moral philosophy
 Moral pluralism
 Moral psychology
 Moral rationalism
 Moral realism
 Moral reasoning
 Moral relativism
 Moral responsibility
 Moral scepticism
 Moral sense
 Moral sense theory
 Moral skepticism
 Moral status of animals in the ancient world
 Moral subjectivism
 Moral syncretism
 Moral treatment
 Moral universalism
 Moralism
 Moralistic fallacy
 Morality
 Morality play
 Morality without religion
 Moralium dogma philosophorum
 Morals
 Morals by Agreement
 Moravec's paradox
 Mordecai Kaplan
 Mores
 Moritz Carrière
 Moritz Geiger
 Moritz Lazarus
 Moritz Schlick
 Morphological freedom
 Morris Weitz
 Mortalism
 Morteza Motahhari
 Mortimer J. Adler
 Morton White
 Mos maiorum
 Moscow Conceptualists
 Moses Ben Jacob Ibn Ezra
 Moses ben Joshua
 Moses ben Maimon
 Moses ben Nahman
 Moses Hess
 Moses ibn Ezra
 Moses Ibn Ezra
 Moses Maimonides
 Moses Mendelssohn
 Moses Nahmanides
 Moses Schönfinkel
 Moshé Machover
 Mostafa Malekian
 Motion (physics)
 Motivation
 Motivational internalism
 Motoori Norinaga
 Mottainai
 Mou Zongsan
 Movement Against the Monarchy
 Movement of Animals
 Moving the goalpost
 Mozi
 Mr. Palomar
 Mu'ayyad fi'l-Din al-Shirazi
 Mu'tazila
 Muhammad 'Abduh
 Muhammad Abduh
 Muhammad Ali Siddiqui
 Muhammad Baqir Mir Damad
 Muhammad Husayn Tabatabaei
 Muhammad ibn Muhammad Tabrizi
 Muhammad ibn Zakariya al-Razi
 Muhammad Iqbal
 Muhammed Hamdi Yazır
 Muhsen Feyz Kashani
 Muirhead Library of Philosophy
 Mujeres Libres
 Mujo
 Mujō
 Mūlamadhyamakakārikā
 Mulla Hadi Sabzevari
 Mulla Sadra
 Multi-criteria decision analysis
 Multi-valued logic
 Multicultural particularism
 Multiculturalism
 Multimodal logic
 Multiperspectivalism
 Multiple-conclusion logic
 Multiple discovery
 Multiple Drafts Model
 Multiple realizability
 Multiple time dimensions
 Multiplicity (philosophy)
 Multitude
 Multitudes (journal)
 Multiverse
 Mumbo Jumbo (phrase)
 Münchhausen trilemma
 Mundane reason
 Munich phenomenology
 Muro Kyūsō
 Murray Bookchin
 Murray Clarke
 Murray Rothbard
 Musa al-Sadr
 Musa Ibn Maimon
 Music
 Musica universalis
 Musical historicism
 Musicology
 Musonius Rufus
 Mussar movement
 Mutatis mutandis
 Mutual aid (organization theory)
 Mutual Aid: A Factor of Evolution
 Mutual liberty
 Mutualism (economic theory)
 Mutually exclusive events
 My Philosophical Development
 Myia
 Mykhailo Drahomanov
 Mylan Engel
 Myles Burnyeat
 Myles Frederic Burnyeat
 Myōe
 Myson of Chenae
 Mysterium Cosmographicum
 Mystical experience
 Mystical philosophy of antiquity
 Mystical realism
 Mystical theology
 Mysticism
 Myth of Er
 Myth of Progress
 Myth of the given
 Mythologies (book)
 Mythos (Aristotle)

N 

 N-tuple
 Nabat
 Nachman Krochmal
 Nader El-Bizri
 Nae Ionescu
 Nagarjuna
 Nāgārjuna
 Nahmanides
 Naïve empiricism
 Naive realism
 Naïve realism
 Najmuddin Kubra
 Nakae Chōmin
 Nalin de Silva
 Namarupa
 Name
 Name calling
 Names
 Naming and Necessity
 Namus
 Nancey Murphy
 Nancy Cartwright (philosopher)
 Narayana Guru
 Narhar Ambadas Kurundkar
 Naropa
 Narrative
 Narrative logic
 Nasir al-Din al-Tusi
 Nasir Khusraw
 Nassim Nicholas Taleb
 Nasty, brutish, and short
 Nate Ackerman
 Nathan Birnbaum
 Nathan Salmon
 Nathaniel Culverwell
 Nation
 National-Anarchism
 National character
 National Commission for the Protection of Human Subjects of Biomedical and Behavioral Research
 National Federation of Atheist, Humanist and Secular Student Societies
 National Research Act
 National Secular Society
 Nationalism
 Nationalism and Culture
 Nationalism studies
 Nations and Nationalism
 Nativism
 Natura naturans
 Natura naturata
 Natura non facit saltus
 Natural (disambiguation)
 Natural and legal rights
 Natural deduction
 Natural Design
 Natural evil
 Natural justice
 Natural kind
 Natural language
 Natural law
 Natural laws
 Natural light
 Natural morality
 Natural number
 Natural order (philosophy)
 Natural philosophy
 Natural religion
 Natural right
 Natural rights
 Natural selection
 Natural sign
 Natural slavery
 Natural Supernaturalism
 Natural theology
 Naturales quaestiones
 Naturalism
 Naturalism (arts)
 Naturalism (philosophy)
 Naturalistic fallacy
 Naturalistic pantheism
 Naturalization
 Naturalized epistemology
 Nature
 Nature (essay)
 Nature (innate)
 Nature (philosophy)
 Nature of God
 Nature versus nurture
 Naturphilosophie
 Naturwissenschaften
 Nausea (novel)
 Nausiphanes
 Navya-Nyāya
 Necessary and sufficient condition
 Necessary and sufficient conditions
 Necessary being
 Necessary condition
 Necessary truth
 Necessitarianism
 Necessity
 Ned Block
 Needs
 Neetham
 NEFAC
 Negarchy
 Negation
 Negative and positive rights
 Negative capability
 Negative Dialectics
 Negative feedback
 Negative freedom
 Negative liberty
 Negative rights
 Negative theology
 Negativity effect
 Neglect of probability
 Negotiation
 Negritude
 Neil Gillman
 Neil MacCormick
 Neil Tennant (philosopher)
 Neither Victims Nor Executioners
 Nel Noddings
 Neleus of Scepsis
 Nelly Richard
 Nelly Roussel
 Nelson Goodman
 Nemesius
 Nemesius of Emesa
 Neo-Aristotelianism (philosophy)
 Neo-conceptual art
 Neo-Confucianism
 Neo-Dada
 Neo-expressionism
 Neo-figurative
 Neo-Futurists
 Neo-Kantianism
 Neo-Luddism
 Neo-medievalism
 Neo-Objectivism
 Neo-pop
 Neo-primitivism
 Neo-Pythagoreanism
 Neo-romanticism
 Neo-Scholasticism
 Neo-theocracy
 Neo-Thomism
 Neoclassicism
 Neocolonial Dependence
 Neofunctionalism (sociology)
 Neomodern
 Neomodernism
 Neonatal perception
 Neoplatonism
 Neoplatonism and Christianity
 Neoplatonism and Gnosticism
 Neopragmatism
 Neopythagoreanism
 Neostoicism
 Neotribalism
 Nespelem (art)
 Néstor García Canclini
 Nestor Makhno
 Neti neti
 Netocracy
 Neue Slowenische Kunst
 Neural correlate
 Neural Darwinism
 Neural net
 Neurath's boat
 Neuroesthetics
 Neuroethics
 Neuromantic (Philosophy)
 Neurophenomenology
 Neurophilosophy
 Neuroscience
 Neutral monism
 Neutrality (philosophy)
 Neven Sesardic
 New Academy
 New Age
 New Confucianism
 New Democracy
 New England Reformers
 New England Transcendentalism
 New England Transcendentalists
 New Essays on Human Understanding
 New Federalism
 New Foundations
 New Historicism
 New International Political Economy
 New legal realism
 New Libertarian Manifesto
 New Mysterianism
 New Objectivity
 New Philosophers
 New Realism
 New realism (philosophy)
 New religious movement
 New Revolutionary Alternative
 New Right
 New Sincerity
 New Thought
 New Times (politics)
 New Wittgenstein
 New York Figurative Expressionism
 Newcomb's paradox
 Newcomb's problem
 Newspeak
 Newton's flaming laser sword
 Newton da Costa
 Newtonian
 Newtonianism
 Niall Shanks
 Nicarete of Megara
 Niccolò Cabeo
 Niccolò Machiavelli
 Nichiren
 Nicholas Agar
 Nicholas Hill (scientist)
 Nicholas Kalliakis
 Nicholas Krebs
 Nicholas Kryfts
 Nicholas Leonicus Thomaeus
 Nicholas Maxwell
 Nicholas of Autrecourt
 Nicholas of Cusa
 Nicholas of Kues
 Nicholas Onufrievich Lossky
 Nicholas Rescher
 Nicholas Wolterstorff
 Nick Bostrom
 Nick Land
 Nick Ribush
 Nick Trakakis
 Nicla Vassallo
 Nicola Abbagnano
 Nicola Antonio Stigliola
 Nicolai A. Vasiliev
 Nicolai Hartmann
 Nicolás Gómez Dávila
 Nicolas Malebranche
 Nicolaus Copernicus
 Nicolaus Hieronymus Gundling
 Nicolaus of Damascus
 Nicolaus Taurellus
 Nicole C. Karafyllis
 Nicole Oresme
 Nicoletto Vernia
 Nicomachean Ethics
 Nicomachus
 Nicomachus (son of Aristotle)
 Nida Vasiliauskaitė
 Niels Bohr
 Niels Treschow
 Nietzsche's views on women
 Nietzsche-Archiv
 Nietzsche and free will
 Nietzsche and Philosophy
 Nietzsche contra Wagner
 Nietzschean affirmation
 Nigel Warburton
 Nigidius Figulus
 Nihilism
 Nihilist paradox
 Nikephoros Choumnos
 Nikola Milošević (politician)
 Nikolai Berdyaev
 Nikolai Bugaev
 Nikolai Fedorovich Federov
 Nikolai Fëdorovich Fëderov
 Nikolai Fyodorovich Fyodorov
 Nikolai Konstantinovich Mikhailovskii
 Nikolai Lobachevsky
 Nikolai Lossky
 Nikolai Putyatin
 Nikolas Kompridis
 Nikolay Chernyshevsky
 Nikolay Strakhov
 Nikos Kazantzakis
 Nimbarka
 Nina Karin Monsen
 Nine Noble Virtues
 Nino Cocchiarella
 Ninth Letter (Plato)
 Nirvana
 Nirvana (Jainism)
 Nirvana fallacy
 Nishi Amane
 Nishida Kitaro
 Nishida Kitarō
 Nishitani Keiji
 Nishkam Karma
 No Exit
 No true Scotsman
 Noam Chomsky
 Noam Chomsky's political views
 Noble Eightfold Path
 Noble lie
 Noble savage
 Nocebo
 Noe Ito
 Noël Carroll
 Noema
 Noesis (phenomenology)
 Noetics
 Noise
 Nomenclature
 Nominal definition
 Nominalism
 Nominalization
 Nomological danglers
 Nomos
 Nomothetic
 Nomothetic and idiographic
 Non-archimedean time
 Non-Aristotelian logic
 Non-classical logic
 Non-cognitivism
 Non-essentialism
 Non-Euclidean geometry
 Non-heart-beating donation
 Non-monotonic logic
 Non-philosophy
 Non-physical entity
 Non-politics
 Non-rigid designator
 Non-standard analysis
 Non-standard model
 Non-voting
 Non causa pro causa
 Non sequitur (logic)
 Nona L. Brooks
 Noncognitivism
 Noncontracting grammar
 Nondualism
 Noneism
 Nonfirstorderizability
 Nonmaleficence
 Nonsense
 Nontheism
 Nontheist Friend
 Nonviolence
 Noogony
 Noology
 Noosphere
 Norbert Bolz
 Norbert Leser
 Norberto Bobbio
 Nordic Journal of Philosophical Logic
 Norm (philosophy)
 Norm (sociology)
 Norm Daniels
 Norm of reciprocity
 Normal
 Normal form
 Normalization
 Norman Daniels
 Norman Geisler
 Norman Kemp Smith
 Norman Kretzmann
 Norman Malcolm
 Norman Melchert
 Norman Robert Campbell
 Norman Swartz
 Normative
 Normative ethics
 Normative science
 Normative statement
 Normlessness
 Northrop Frye
 Northwest School (art)
 Norwich School (art movement)
 Norwood Russell Hanson
 Nos, Book of the Resurrection
 Not even wrong
 Notation
 Notations
 Notes on "Camp"
 Nothing
 Nothing comes from nothing
 Nothingness
 Notion
 Notion (philosophy)
 Noumena
 Noumenon
 Nous
 Noûs
 Novalis
 Novum Organum
 Now and After
 Nuccio Ordine
 Núcleo de Estudos em Ética e Desconstrução
 Nuel Belnap
 Number
 Number theory
 Numenius
 Numenius of Apamea
 Numerical identity
 Numinous
 NuPRL
 Nur Ali Elahi
 Nuremberg Code
 Nursing ethics
 Nyaya
 Nyāya
 Nyāya Sūtras
 NYC Ya Basta Collective
 Nymphidianus of Smyrna

O 

 Oath
 Oath of Asaph
 Obedience (human behavior)
 Object (philosophy)
 Object of the mind
 Objectification
 Objection (argument)
 Objective idealism
 Objective precision
 Objective reality
 Objectivism
 Objectivism: The Philosophy of Ayn Rand
 Objectivist movement
 Objectivist movement in India
 Objectivist philosophy
 Objectivist theory of value
 Objectivity (philosophy)
 Objectivity (science)
 Objet petit a
 Obligation
 Obscurantism
 Observation
 Observations on Man
 Observations on the Feeling of the Beautiful and Sublime
 Observer-expectancy effect
 Observer effect
 Obversion
 Occam's razor
 Occasion of sin
 Occasionalism
 Occurrent belief
 Ocellus Lucanus
 Ockham's razor
 Octave Garnier
 Octave Hamelin
 Octave Mirbeau
 Octavio Paz
 October (journal)
 Odium theologicum
 Odo of Châteauroux
 Oeconomicus
 Oedipus Rex
 Oenomaus of Gadara
 Oets Kolk Bouwsma
 Of Grammatology
 Of Miracles
 Of the Conduct of the Understanding
 Ogyū Sorai
 Okishio's theorem
 Olaf Helmer
 Olaf Stapledon
 Olavo de Carvalho
 Oleksiy Onyschenko
 Olga Hahn-Neurath
 Olga Taratuta
 Oligarchy
 Oliver Franks, Baron Franks
 Oliver Leaman
 Oliver Letwin
 Oliver Wendell Holmes Jr
 Oliver Wendell Holmes, Jr.
 Olympiodorus
 Olympiodorus the Elder
 Olympiodorus the Younger
 Omar Khayyám
 Omega
 Omega-consistent
 Omega-regular language
 Omega language
 Omega Point
 Omission
 Omission bias
 Omnibenevolence
 Omnipotence
 Omnipotence paradox
 Omnipresence
 Omniscience
 Omphalos hypothesis
 On Ayn Rand
 On Breath
 On Bullshit
 On Certainty
 On Colors
 On Contradiction (Mao Zedong)
 On Denoting
 On Divination in Sleep
 On Dreams
 On Formally Undecidable Propositions of Principia Mathematica and Related Systems
 On Generation and Corruption
 On Indivisible Lines
 On Length and Shortness of Life
 On Liberty
 On Marvellous Things Heard
 On Melissus, Xenophanes, and Gorgias
 On Memory
 On Nature
 On Plants
 On Sleep
 On the Basis of Morality
 On the Bondage of the Will
 On the Concept of Irony with Continual Reference to Socrates
 On the Fourfold Root of the Principle of Sufficient Reason
 On the Freedom of the Will
 On the Genealogy of Morality
 On the Heavens
 On the Plurality of Worlds
 On the Poverty of Student Life
 On the Soul
 On the Universe
 On Things Heard
 On Truth
 On Truth and Lies in a Nonmoral Sense
 On Virtues and Vices
 On Vision and Colors
 On Youth, Old Age, Life and Death, and Respiration
 Onasander
 Onatas (philosopher)
 One-sided argument
 Onesicritus
 Onora O'Neill
 Onora O'Neill, Baroness O'Neill of Bengarve
 Ontic
 Onto-theology
 OntoClean
 Ontological argument
 Ontological argument for the existence of God
 Ontological commitment
 Ontological maximalism
 Ontological paradox
 Ontological pluralism
 Ontological security
 Ontologism
 Ontology
 Ontology alignment
 Ontotheology
 Op art
 Opaque context
 Open government
 Open-ended question
 Open-question argument
 Open sentence
 Open society
 Open source
 Open texture
 Open world assumption
 Openness
 Operant conditioning
 Operational definition
 Operationalism
 Operationalization
 Opinion
 Opium of the people
 Opportunity cost
 Oppression
 Optics
 Optimism
 Optimism bias
 Or Adonai
 Oration on the Dignity of Man
 Orch-OR
 Orchot Tzaddikim
 Ordered n-tuple
 Ordered pair
 Ordered set
 Ordinal utility
 Ordinary-language philosophy
 Ordinary and extraordinary care
 Ordinary language
 Ordinary language philosophy
 Orestes Brownson
 Organ donation
 Organ donation in Jewish law
 Organic (model)
 Organic composition of capital
 Organic law
 Organic society
 Organic statute
 Organic unity
 Organic work
 Organicism
 Organism
 Organizational ethics
 Organizing principle
 Organon
 Oriental despotism
 Orientalism
 Orientalism (book)
 Origen
 Origen the Pagan
 Origin of Consciousness in the Breakdown of the Bicameral Mind
 Original intent
 Original meaning
 Original position
 Original proof of Gödel's completeness theorem
 Original sin
 Originalism
 Origination
 Orlando J. Smith
 Orpheus
 Orphism
 Orphism (art)
 Orphism (religion)
 Orthodox Trotskyism
 Orthogenesis
 Orthotes
 Oscar Wilde
 Oskar Becker
 Oskar Ewald
 Oskar Kraus
 Oskar Negt
 Osmund Lewry
 Ostension
 Ostensive definition
 Osvaldo Lira
 Oswald Hanfling
 Oswald Spengler
 Otfried Höffe
 Other (philosophy)
 Other minds
 Other minds problem
 Othmar Spann
 Otto Bauer
 Otto Buek
 Otto Friedrich Bollnow
 Otto Friedrich Gruppe
 Otto Kirchheimer
 Otto Liebmann
 Otto Mencke
 Otto Neurath
 Otto Selz
 Otto von Gierke
 Otto Weininger
 Ought
 Ought-is
 Ought-is distinction
 Ought-is problem
 Ought and is
 Our Generation
 Our Posthuman Future
 Ousia
 Out-group homogeneity bias
 Outcome bias
 Outlaw
 Outline of anarchism
 Outline of critical theory
 Outline of epistemology
 Outline of humanism
 Outline of logic
 Outline of philosophy
 Outline of theology
 Over-soul
 Overbelief
 Overconfidence effect
 Overdetermination
 Overlapping consensus
 Overproduction
 Overwhelming exception
 Owen Barfield
 Owen Flanagan
 Owenism
 Owl of Minerva
 Ownership
 Oxford Calculators
 Oxford Franciscan school
 Oxford Literary Review

P 

 P. D. Ouspensky
 P. F. Strawson
 P. G. Winch
 Pacific Philosophical Quarterly
 Pacific Street Films
 Pacificism
 Pacifism
 Pacifism as Pathology: Notes on an American Pseudopraxis
 Package-deal fallacy
 Paconius Agrippinus
 Padmapadacharya
 Padmasambhava
 Pain
 Pain (philosophy)
 Paired opposites
 Pakistani philosophy
 Paleoconservatism
 Palingenesis
 Páll Skúlason
 Palla Strozzi
 Pamela Sue Anderson
 Pamprepius
 Pan-Africanism
 Pan-Slavism
 Pan Pingge
 Panaetius
 Panagiotis Kondylis
 Panait Cerna
 Panarchism
 Panayot Butchvarov
 Pancrates of Athens
 Pancritical rationalism
 Pandeism
 Panentheism
 Panic Movement
 Panlogism
 Panopticon
 Panpsychism
 Panrationalism
 Pantheism
 Pantheism controversy
 Panthoides
 Pantisocracy
 Paola Cavalieri
 Paolo da Pergola
 Paolo Virno
 Papunya Tula
 Parable of the Invisible Gardener
 Paracelsus
 Paraconsistency
 Paraconsistent logic
 Parade of horribles
 Paradigm
 Paradigm shift
 Paradox
 Paradox of analysis
 Paradox of hedonism
 Paradox of the Court
 Paradox of the heap
 Paradox of the stone
 Paradox of tolerance
 Paradoxes
 Paradoxes of material implication
 Paradoxes of set theory
 Paradoxology
 Paragone
 Paralanguage
 Parallel distributed processing
 Parallel universe
 Parallelism
 Paramartha
 Parametric determinism
 Pāramitā
 Paranormal phenomena
 Paraphrasis
 Parapsychology
 Pareidolia
 Parenting For Everyone
 Pareto efficiency
 Pareto optimality
 Pareto principle
 Paris Commune
 Park Yeol
 Parmenides
 Parmenides (dialogue)
 Parmenides Foundation
 Parousia
 Parrhesia
 Pars destruens/pars construens
 Parse tree
 Parser (magazine)
 Parsimony
 Parsing
 Part-whole theory
 Partial function
 Partial order
 Partial ordering
 Participation
 Participation (philosophy)
 Participatory democracy
 Participatory theory
 Particle physics
 Particular
 Particular proposition
 Particularism
 Particulars
 Partido por la Victoria del Pueblo
 Partiinost'
 Partition
 Partonomy
 Parts of Animals
 Parva Naturalia
 Pascal's wager
 Pascal's Wager
 Pascal Engel
 Pasicles of Thebes
 Pasquale Galluppi
 Passions (philosophy)
 Passions of the Soul
 Passive euthanasia
 Passive intellect
 Past
 Pastiche
 Patanjali
 Patañjali
 Paternalism
 Pathetic fallacy
 Pathological fascism
 Pathological science
 Pathos
 Patience
 Patient advocacy
 Patient safety
 Patri Friedman
 Patriarch Gennadios II of Constantinople
 Patriarchalism
 Patricia Churchland
 Patricia Russell (nee Spence)
 Patrick Benedict Zimmer
 Patrick Edward Dove
 Patrick Suppes
 Patro the Epicurean
 Pattern
 Pau Sabater
 Paul-Henri-Dietrich d'Holbach
 Paul-Henri Thiry, Baron d'Holbach
 Paul-Louis Couchoud
 Paul A. Freund
 Paul Avrich
 Paul Benacerraf
 Paul Bernays
 Paul Boghossian
 Paul Carus
 Paul Chamberlain
 Paul Churchland
 Paul Cobben
 Paul Copan
 Paul de Man
 Paul Deussen
 Paul Draper (philosopher)
 Paul Edwards (philosopher)
 Paul Erdős
 Paul Feyerabend
 Paul Fletcher (theologian)
 Paul Gerhard Natorp
 Paul Gochet
 Paul Grice
 Paul Guyer
 Paul Häberlin
 Paul Hensel
 Paul Horwich
 Paul Humphreys (philosopher)
 Paul J. Griffiths
 Paul Janet
 Paul Karl Feyerabend
 Paul Kurtz
 Paul Lorenzen
 Paul Moser
 Paul Natorp
 Paul Nizan
 Paul Nougé
 Paul of Venice
 Paul R. Patton
 Paul Ramsey (ethicist)
 Paul Ree
 Paul Rée
 Paul Ricoeur
 Paul Ricœur
 Paul Russell (philosopher)
 Paul Taylor (philosopher)
 Paul Thagard
 Paul Tillich
 Paul Virilio
 Paul Weiss (philosopher)
 Paul Woodruff
 Paul Yorck von Wartenburg
 Paul Ziff
 Paulin J. Hountondji
 Paulo Cesar Duque-Estrada
 Paulo Freire
 Paulus Persa
 Paulus Venetus
 Pavel Aleksandrovich Florenskii
 Pavel Florensky
 Pavel Tichý
 Peace
 Peace in Islamic philosophy
 Peacekeeping
 Peak–end rule
 Peano axioms
 Peano postulates
 Pedro da Fonseca (philosopher)
 Pedro Hurtado de Mendoza
 Peirce's law
 Pekka Himanen
 Pelagianism
 Pelagius
 Pema Chödrön
 Penelope Mackie
 Penelope Maddy
 Pennsylvania Impressionism
 Pensées
 Pension spiking
 Pentti Linkola
 People (disambiguation)
 Pepita Carpeña
 Per Bauhn
 Per Martin-Löf
 Percept
 Perception
 Percepts
 Perceptual paradox
 Percy Williams Bridgman
 Perdurance
 Perdurantism
 Peregrinus Proteus
 Perennial philosophy
 Perfect competition
 Perfect solution fallacy
 Perfection
 Perfection (concept)
 Perfection (disambiguation)
 Perfectionism (philosophy)
 Performance
 Performative
 Performative contradiction
 Performative text
 Performative utterance
 Performative utterances
 Performatives
 Performativity
 Performing art
 Perictione
 Peripatetic axiom
 Peripatetic school
 Peripatetics
 Peripatos
 Peritrope
 Periyar E. V. Ramasamy
 Perlocutionary act
 Permanent war economy
 Permission (philosophy)
 Perpetual peace
 Persaeus
 Persecution
 Persecution and the Art of Writing
 Persecution of philosophers
 Persian Letters
 Persian Psalms
 Persistence
 Person
 Personal identity
 Personal life
 Personal life of Marcus Tullius Cicero
 Personalism
 Personhood
 Persons
 Perspective (cognitive)
 Perspectives on Anarchist Theory
 Perspectivism
 Persuasive definition
 Persuasive technology
 Perverse incentive
 Perversion
 Pessimism
 Pessimistic induction
 Peter A. Singer
 Peter Abelard
 Peter Achinstein
 Peter Arshinov
 Peter Aureol
 Peter B. Andrews (mathematician)
 Peter Bieri (author)
 Peter Browne (theologian)
 Peter Carruthers (philosopher)
 Peter Caws
 Peter Ceffons
 Peter Crockaert
 Peter D. Klein
 Peter Damian
 Peter de Rivo
 Peter Deunov
 Peter Dews
 Peter F. Strawson
 Peter Frederick Strawson
 Peter Geach
 Peter Gelderloos
 Peter Glassen
 Peter Godfrey-Smith
 Peter Goldie
 Peter Hacker
 Peter Hallward
 Peter Helias
 Peter Janich
 Peter John Olivi
 Peter Joseph Elvenich
 Peter Kaufmann (philosopher)
 Peter Kingsley
 Peter Kreeft
 Peter Kropotkin
 Peter Lavrovich Lavrov
 Peter Lipton
 Peter Lombard
 Peter Ludlow
 Peter Lunenfeld
 Peter Millican
 Peter Munz
 Peter Ochs
 Peter of Ailly
 Peter of Auvergne
 Peter of Capua the Elder
 Peter of Corbeil
 Peter of Poitiers
 Peter of Spain
 Peter Olivi
 Peter Pagin
 Péter Pázmány
 Peter Railton
 Peter Serracino Inglott
 Peter Simons
 Peter Singer
 Peter Sloterdijk
 Peter Steinberger
 Peter Stephen Du Ponceau
 Peter Stillman (academic)
 Peter Strawson
 Peter Suber
 Peter the Iberian
 Peter Thielst
 Peter Thomas Geach
 Peter Tudvad
 Peter Unger
 Peter Vallentyne
 Peter van Inwagen
 Peter Vardy (theologian)
 Peter Wenz
 Peter Wessel Zapffe
 Peter Winch
 Petitio principii
 Petr Alekseevich Kropotkin
 Pëtr Alekseevich Kropotkin
 Petr Lavrovich Lavrov
 Pëtr Lavrovich Lavrov
 Petrarch
 Petre Ţuţea
 Petrick's method
 Petrus Aureolus
 Petrus de Ibernia
 Petrus Ramus
 Phaedo
 Phaedo of Elis
 Phaedrus (dialogue)
 Phaedrus the Epicurean
 Phaleas of Chalcedon
 Phallogocentrism
 Phaneron
 Phanias of Eresus
 Phanto of Phlius
 Phase space
 Phenomena
 Phenomenal
 Phenomenal conservatism
 Phenomenalism
 Phenomenological definition of God
 Phenomenological life
 Phenomenological reduction
 Phenomenological Sociology
 Phenomenology (philosophy)
 Phenomenology of essences
 Phenomenology of Perception
 Phenomenology of religion
 Phenomenon
 Pherecydes of Syros
 Phi Sigma Tau
 Philanthropreneur
 Philanthropy
 Philebus
 Philia
 Philip Berrigan
 Philip Faber
 Philip Grosser
 Philip H. Rhinelander
 Philip Hallie
 Philip II of Macedon
 Philip Jourdain
 Philip Kitcher
 Philip L. Quinn
 Philip Mazzei
 Philip Melanchthon
 Philip Mirowski
 Philip of Opus
 Philip Pettit
 Philip the Chancellor
 Philip Wheelwright
 Philip Willem van Heusde
 Philip Zhai
 Philipp Albert Stapfer
 Philipp Frank
 Philipp Mainländer
 Philipp Melanchthon
 Philippa Foot
 Philippa R. Foot
 Philippe Devaux
 Philippe Lacoue-Labarthe
 Philippe Nys
 Philippe Van Parijs
 Philiscus of Aegina
 Philiscus of Thessaly
 Philistinism
 Philistus
 Phillip Cary
 Phillip H. Wiebe
 Philo
 Philo's view of God
 Philo's Works
 Philo (journal)
 Philo Judaeus
 Philo of Alexandria
 Philo of Larissa
 Philo the Dialectician
 Philo the Megarian
 Philodemus
 Philolaus
 Philonides of Laodicea
 Philoponus
 Philosophaster
 Philosophe
 Philosopher
 Philosopher's axe
 Philosopher's Axe
 Philosopher's football
 Philosopher's Football
 Philosopher's stone
 Philosopher's Stone
 Philosopher's Walk
 Philosopher's wool
 Philosopher-king
 Philosopher Han Xiang
 Philosopher king
 Philosopher Kings
 Philosopher of history
 Philosopher of science
 Philosopher stone
 Philosophers
 Philosophers' Football
 Philosophers' Imprint
 Philosophers' stone
 Philosophers Football Match
 Philosophes
 Philosophia Africana
 Philosophia perennis
 Philosophiae Naturalis Principia Mathematica
 Philosophic
 Philosophic school
 Philosophic sin
 Philosophical
 Philosophical analysis
 Philosophical anarchism
 Philosophical anthropology
 Philosophical arguments for censorship
 Philosophical aspects of the abortion debate
 Philosophical Consultancy
 Philosophical counseling
 Philosophical Counseling
 Philosophical dictionaries and encyclopaedias
 Philosophical dictionaries and encyclopedias
 Philosophical Dictionary
 Philosophical Explanations
 Philosophical Explorations
 Philosophical fiction
 Philosophical Foundations of Marxist-Leninist Atheism
 Philosophical Fragments
 Philosophical Gourmet
 Philosophical Gourmet Report
 Philosophical idealism
 Philosophical Inquiries into the Essence of Human Freedom
 Philosophical interpretation of classical physics
 Philosophical introspection
 Philosophical intuition
 Philosophical Investigations
 Philosophical Investigations (journal)
 Philosophical Issues
 Philosophical journals
 Philosophical language
 Philosophical logic
 Philosophical method
 Philosophical Method
 Philosophical method/Introduction
 Philosophical movement
 Philosophical Movements
 Philosophical naturalism
 Philosophical naturalist
 Philosophical novel
 Philosophical Perspectives
 Philosophical pessimism
 Philosophical problems of testimony
 Philosophical progress
 Philosophical Psychology (journal)
 Philosophical Radicals
 Philosophical realism
 Philosophical scepticism
 Philosophical School of Elis
 Philosophical schools
 Philosophical sin
 Philosophical skepticism
 Philosophical Studies
 Philosophical subdisciplines
 Philosophical Subdisciplines
 Philosophical theism
 Philosophical theology
 Philosophical theories
 Philosophical theory
 Philosophical Topics
 Philosophical Transactions
 Philosophical view
 Philosophical View
 Philosophical Writings
 Philosophical zombie
 Philosophie Zoologique
 Philosophies
 Philosophy
 Philosophy (journal)
 Philosophy and literature
 Philosophy and Literature
 Philosophy and Phenomenological Research
 Philosophy and Public Affairs
 Philosophy and Real Politics
 Philosophy and religion of the Tlingit
 Philosophy and science
 Philosophy and Social Hope
 Philosophy and space and time
 Philosophy and Spiritualism of Sri Aurobindo
 Philosophy and the Mirror of Nature
 Philosophy as Cultural Politics
 Philosophy basic topics
 Philosophy Documentation Center
 Philosophy East and West
 Philosophy encyclopedia
 Philosophy for Children
 Philosophy For Children
 Philosophy in a New Key
 Philosophy in Canada
 Philosophy in the Bedroom
 Philosophy in the Soviet Union
 Philosophy in the Tragic Age of the Greeks
 Philosophy naturalism
 Philosophy Now
 Philosophy of accounting
 Philosophy of action
 Philosophy of Africa
 Philosophy of Aristotle
 Philosophy of Arithmetic (book)
 Philosophy of art
 Philosophy of artificial intelligence
 Philosophy of biology
 Philosophy of Buddhism
 Philosophy of business
 Philosophy of chemistry
 Philosophy of color
 Philosophy of Common Sense
 Philosophy of composition
 Philosophy of computer science
 Philosophy of copyright
 Philosophy of design
 Philosophy of dialogue
 Philosophy of economics
 Philosophy of Economics
 Philosophy of education
 Philosophy of Education
 Philosophy of engineering
 Philosophy of Existence
 Philosophy of film
 Philosophy of Freedom
 Philosophy of Friedrich Nietzsche
 Philosophy of futility
 Philosophy of geography
 Philosophy of healthcare
 Philosophy of history
 Philosophy of information
 Philosophy of knowledge
 Philosophy of language
 Philosophy of Language
 Philosophy of law
 Philosophy of Law
 Philosophy of life
 Philosophy of Life
 Philosophy of literature
 Philosophy of logic
 Philosophy of Logic
 Philosophy of love
 Philosophy of mathematics
 Philosophy of mathematics education
 Philosophy of Mathematics Education Journal
 Philosophy of Max Stirner
 Philosophy of mind
 Philosophy of Mind
 Philosophy of mixed government
 Philosophy of music
 Philosophy of naturalism
 Philosophy of nature
 Philosophy of neuroscience
 Philosophy of organism
 Philosophy of Organism
 Philosophy of perception
 Philosophy of Perception
 Philosophy of physics
 Philosophy of probability
 Philosophy of psychology
 Philosophy of religion
 Philosophy of Religion
 Philosophy of science
 Philosophy of Science
 Philosophy of Science (journal)
 Philosophy of Science Association
 Philosophy of sex
 Philosophy of social science
 Philosophy of Social Science
 Philosophy of social sciences
 Philosophy of Søren Kierkegaard
 Philosophy of space and time
 Philosophy of Spinoza
 Philosophy of statistics
 Philosophy of suicide
 Philosophy of technology
 Philosophy of the mind
 Philosophy of the social sciences
 Philosophy of thermal and statistical physics
 Philosophy of Thermal and Statistical Physics
 Philosophy of time
 Philosophy of war
 Philosophy realism
 Philosophy Talk
 Philosophy, Politics and Economics
 Philosophy, Psychiatry, & Psychology
 Philosophy: The Quest for Truth
 Philosophy: Who Needs It
 Philostratus
 Philotheus Boehner
 PhilPapers
 Phintys
 Phonaesthetics
 Phonemic imagery
 Phonestheme
 Phonocentrism
 Photios I of Constantinople
 Photorealism
 Phrase structure
 Phronesis
 Physical attractiveness
 Physical body
 Physical law
 Physical ontology
 Physical symbol system
 Physicalism
 Physician-assisted suicide
 Physician–patient privilege
 Physics (Aristotle)
 Physics envy
 Physiognomonics
 Physis
 Pi
 Picture language
 Picture superiority effect
 Pictures
 Picturesque
 Pien
 Pieranna Garavaso
 Piergiorgio Odifreddi
 Pierre-André Taguieff
 Pierre-Joseph Proudhon
 Pierre-Maurice-Marie Duhem
 Pierre-Simon Ballanche
 Pierre-Simon Laplace
 Pierre-Simon, Marquis de Laplace
 Pierre-Sylvain Regis
 Pierre-Sylvain Régis
 Pierre Abailard
 Pierre Abélard
 Pierre Bayle
 Pierre Besnard
 Pierre Bourdieu
 Pierre Boutang
 Pierre Cally
 Pierre Charron
 Pierre d'Ailly
 Pierre Daniel Huet
 Pierre de Bar
 Pierre de la Ramee
 Pierre de la Ramée
 Pierre Duhem
 Pierre Eugene du Simitiere
 Pierre Gassendi
 Pierre Hadot
 Pierre Hyacinthe Azais
 Pierre Jean George Cabanis
 Pierre Klossowski
 Pierre La Ramee
 Pierre La Ramée
 Pierre Laffitte
 Pierre Laromiguière
 Pierre Lecomte du Noüy
 Pierre Leroux
 Pierre Lévy (philosopher)
 Pierre Manent
 Pierre Maurice Marie Duhem
 Pierre Monatte
 Pierre Nicole
 Pierre Paul Royer-Collard
 Pierre Teilhard de Chardin
 Piers Benn
 Pietas (virtue)
 Pieter Nicolaas van Eyck
 Pietism
 Pietro Alcionio
 Pietro d'Abano
 Pietro Pomponazzi
 Pietro Ubaldi
 Pietro Verri
 Piety
 Pineal gland
 Pio Colonnello
 Pioneers of American Freedom
 Piotr Chmielowski
 Piotr Lenartowicz
 Pirate utopia
 Pirmin Stekeler-Weithofer
 Pirsig's metaphysics of Quality
 Pistis
 Pistolerismo
 Pity
 Piya Tan
 Placebo
 Placide Tempels
 Plagiarism
 Plane of immanence
 Plane Stupid
 Plank of Carneades
 Planned economy
 Planned obsolescence
 Planning fallacy
 Plantinga's free-will defense
 Plasticien
 Platform Sutra
 Platformism
 Plato
 Plato's allegory of the cave
 Plato's divided line
 Plato's Dream
 Plato's five regimes
 Plato's four cardinal virtues
 Plato's metaphor of the sun
 Plato's number
 Plato's Problem
 Plato's Republic
 Plato's tripartite theory of soul
 Plato and a Platypus Walk Into a Bar
 Platonia (philosophy)
 Platonic Academy
 Platonic Academy (Florence)
 Platonic epistemology
 Platonic form
 Platonic idealism
 Platonic love
 Platonic realism
 Platonism
 Platonism in the Renaissance
 Plausibility
 Playing God (ethics)
 Pleasure
 Pleasure principle (psychology)
 Plenist
 Plenitude principle
 Plenitude
 Pleonexia
 Pleroma
 Pliny the Elder
 Pliny the Younger
 Plotinus
 Plural quantification
 Pluralism (philosophy)
 Pluralism (political philosophy)
 Pluralist school
 Pluralist theories of truth
 Plutarch
 Plutarch of Athens
 Plutarch of Chaeronea
 Plutocracy
 Pneuma
 Pneuma (Stoic)
 Poale Zion
 Poetics (Aristotle)
 Poetry
 Poiesis
 Poisoning the well
 Polarity
 Polarized pluralism
 Polemarchus
 Polemic (magazine)
 Polemon (scholarch)
 Polemon of Athens
 Polemon of Laodicea
 Policraticus
 Polish logic
 Polish Logic
 Polish notation
 Polish philosophy
 Politeia
 Politeness
 Political
 Political argument
 Political consciousness
 Political culture
 Political engineering
 Political ideologies in the United States
 Political jurisprudence
 Political Justice
 Political machine
 Political nihilism
 Political Order in Changing Societies
 Political particularism
 Political philosophy
 Political philosophy of Immanuel Kant
 Political pluralism
 Political positivism
 Political privacy
 Political radicalism
 Political rehabilitation
 Political sociology
 Political Soldier
 Political structure
 Political theology
 Political theory
 Politics
 Politics (Aristotle)
 Politics and Vision: Continuity and Innovation in Western Political Thought
 Politics Drawn from the Very Words of Holy Scripture
 Polity (Aristotle)
 Pollyanna principle
 Polus
 Polyaenus of Lampsacus
 Polylogism
 Polysemy
 Polystratus the Epicurean
 Polysyllogism
 Pons asinorum
 Pontus Wikner
 Pooh and the Philosophers
 Pop art
 Pope Gregory I
 Pope Sylvester II
 Popper's experiment
 Popper and After
 Popperian cosmology
 Popular assembly
 Popular Assembly of the Peoples of Oaxaca
 Popular errors
 Popular psychology
 Popular sovereignty
 Population
 Population ethics
 Populism
 Pornography
 Porphyrian tree
 Porphyry (philosopher)
 Port-Royal Grammar
 Port-Royal Logic
 Port-Royalists
 Poshlost
 Posidonius
 Posit
 Positions
 Positive environmentalism
 Positive feedback
 Positive freedom
 Positive law
 Positive statement
 Positivism
 Positivism dispute
 Positivity effect
 Possession (Proudhon)
 Possibilianism
 Possibility
 Possible world
 Possible worlds
 Post-anarchism
 Post-colonial anarchism
 Post-egoism
 Post-Futurism
 Post-Impressionism
 Post-industrial society
 Post-left anarchy
 Post-Marxism
 Post-materialism
 Post-modernism
 Post-positivist
 Post-postmodernism
 Post-purchase rationalization
 Post-romanticism
 Post-Scarcity Anarchism
 Post-structuralism
 Post correspondence problem
 Post hoc ergo propter hoc
 Post hoc, ergo propter hoc
 Postanalytic philosophy
 Postcard paradox
 Postcolonialism
 Posterior Analytics
 Postfoundationalism
 Posthegemony
 Posthuman
 Posthumanism
 Posthumous sperm retrieval
 Postminimalism
 Postmodern
 Postmodern art
 Postmodern Christianity
 Postmodern philosophy
 Postmodern psychology
 Postmodern social construction of nature
 Postmodern theology
 Postmodern vertigo
 Postmodernism
 Postmodernism in political science
 Postmodernism, or, the Cultural Logic of Late Capitalism
 Postmodernity
 Postpositivism
 Potamo of Alexandria
 Potency
 Potentiality
 Potentiality and actuality
 Potter Box
 Poul Martin Møller
 Pour soi
 Poverty of the stimulus
 Power (philosophy)
 Power (sociology)
 Power harassment
 Power set
 Power: A New Social Analysis
 Prabhākara
 Prabhat Ranjan Sarkar
 Practical
 Practical Anarchy
 Practical arguments
 Practical Ethics
 Practical Metaphysics
 Practical philosophy
 Practical reason
 Practical reasoning
 Practical syllogism
 Practice in Christianity
 Praepositinus
 Prafulla Kumar Sen
 Pragma-dialectics
 Pragmatic contradiction
 Pragmatic mapping
 Pragmatic maxim
 Pragmatic theory of truth
 Pragmaticism
 Pragmatics
 Pragmatism
 Praise
 Prakṛti
 Pramana
 Pratītyasamutpāda
 Pratyekabuddha
 Práxedis Guerrero
 Praxeology
 Praxiphanes
 Praxis
 Praxis (process)
 Praxis intervention
 Praxis Journal of Philosophy
 Praxis school
 Praxis School
 Prayer
 Pre-established harmony
 Pre-Socratic philosophy
 Pre-Socratics
 Pre-theoretic belief
 Precarity
 Precautionary principle
 Precept
 Precising definition
 Precision bias
 Precognition
 Precolonialism
 Preconscious
 Predestination
 Predestination paradox
 Predicables
 Predicate (logic)
 Predicate abstraction
 Predicate calculus
 Predicate logic
 Prediction
 Prediction theory of law
 Predictive power
 Predrag Vranicki
 Preestablished harmony
 Preexistence
 Preface paradox
 Prefaces
 Preference
 Preference utilitarianism
 Prefigurative politics
 Prefix grammar
 Preformation theory
 Preformationism
 Prehension
 Preintuitionism
 Prejudice
 Premise
 Prenex normal form
 Prescriptivism
 Prescriptivity
 Present
 Presentationism
 Presentism (literary and historical analysis)
 Presentism (philosophy of time)
 Presocratic philosophy
 Presupposition
 Presupposition (philosophy)
 Preventable medical error
 Prevention of Disasters Principle
 Prevention paradox
 Price discrimination
 Prices of production
 Pride
 Prima facie
 Prima facie duties
 Prima facie duty
 Prima facie right
 Primary and secondary qualities
 Primary qualities
 Primary substance
 Primary/secondary quality distinction
 Primitivism
 Primum movens
 Primum non nocere
 Prince Shōtoku
 Principia Ethica
 Principia Mathematica
 Principium individuationis
 Principle
 Principle of bivalence
 Principle of charity
 Principle of compositionality
 Principle of comprehension
 Principle of contradiction
 Principle of double effect
 Principle of excluded middle
 Principle of explosion
 Principle of Generic Consistency
 Principle of humanity
 Principle of identity
 Principle of indifference
 Principle of individuation
 Principle of insufficient reason
 Principle of law
 Principle of non-contradiction
 Principle of nonvacuous contrast
 Principle of parsimony
 Principle of rationality
 Principle of subsidiarity
 Principle of sufficient reason
 Principle of uncertainty
 Principles
 Principles of Mathematical Logic
 Principles of Philosophy
 Principlism
 Prior Analytics
 Prior probability
 Priscian of Lydia
 Priscus of Epirus
 Prisoner's dilemma
 Privacy
 Private language
 Private language argument
 Private language problem
 Private law
 Private sphere
 Privation
 Privatism
 Privilege (legal ethics)
 Privileged access
 Priya Reddy
 Pro-aging trance
 Pro hominem
 Proactionary principle
 Probabilism
 Probabilistic automaton
 Probabilistic causation
 Probabilistic independence
 Probability
 Probability calculus
 Probability interpretations
 Probability theory
 Problem
 Problem-based learning
 Problem of evil
 Problem of evil in Hinduism
 Problem of future contingents
 Problem of Hell
 Problem of induction
 Problem of love
 Problem of mental causation
 Problem of multiple generality
 Problem of other minds
 Problem of the criterion
 Problem of universals
 Problematization
 Problems (Aristotle)
 Problems of Peace and Socialism
 Procedural democracy
 Procedural knowledge
 Proceedings of the American Philosophical Society
 Process (philosophy)
 Process and Reality
 Process art
 Process of elimination
 Process philosophy
 Process theism
 Process theology
 Proclus
 Proclus Mallotes
 Procreative beneficence
 Prodicus
 Product term
 Production theory
 Productive forces
 Profane Existence
 Professional courtesy
 Professional ethics
 Professional responsibility
 Professor of Moral Philosophy, Glasgow
 Profiat Duran
 Programming language
 Progress (history)
 Progression of Animals
 Progressivism in the United States
 Prohairesis
 Projectivism
 Prolegomena to Any Future Metaphysics
 Prolepsis
 Proletarian internationalism
 Proletarianization
 Proletariat
 Proletkult
 Promise
 Proof-theoretic semantics
 Proof by assertion
 Proof by contradiction
 Proof by example
 Proof by exhaustion
 Proof by intimidation
 Proof net
 Proof theory
 Proofs and Refutations
 Proofs of eternity
 Propaganda
 Propaganda of the deed
 Propensity
 Propensity probability
 Proper class
 Proper name (philosophy)
 Proper names
 Propertarianism
 Properties
 Property
 Property (philosophy)
 Property dualism
 Property is theft!
 Prophecy
 Proportional reasoning
 Proportionalism
 Proportionality (law)
 Proposition
 Proposition (philosophy)
 Propositional attitude
 Propositional attitudes
 Propositional function
 Propositional knowledge
 Propositional logic
 Propositional operator
 Propositional representation
 Proprietism
 Proprioception
 Proprium
 Prosecutor's fallacy
 Proslogion
 Prosyllogism
 Protagoras
 Protagoras (dialogue)
 Protasis
 Protected values
 Protestant ethic
 Protestant work ethic
 Protests in Washington, D.C. against the International Monetary Fund and the World Bank
 Prototype theory
 Protrepsis and paraenesis
 Provability logic
 Provo (movement)
 Proxenus of Atarneus
 Proximate and ultimate causation
 Prudence
 Prudentialism
 Pseudo-Aristotle
 Pseudo-Demikristo
 Pseudo-Dionysius
 Pseudo-Dionysius the Areopagite
 Pseudo-philosophy
 Pseudo-Plutarch
 Pseudo-science
 Pseudo-secularism
 Pseudo atheism
 Pseudocertainty effect
 Pseudohallucination
 Pseudomathematics
 Pseudophilosophy
 Pseudorandomness
 Pseudoreligion
 Pseudoscience
 Psyche (psychology)
 Psychedelia
 Psychical distance
 Psychical Nomadism
 Psychoanalysis
 Psychoanalysis and Religion
 Psycholinguistics
 Psychological behaviorism
 Psychological egoism
 Psychological hedonism
 Psychological nominalism
 Psychological pain
 Psychological pricing
 Psychological projection
 Psychologism
 Psychologist's fallacy
 Psychology of art
 Psychology of reasoning
 Psychology, Philosophy and Physiology
 Psychophysical parallelism
 Psychophysics
 Ptolemy
 Ptolemy-el-Garib
 Public Administration
 Public good
 Public interest
 Public morality
 Public order crime
 Public reason
 Public sector ethics
 Public sphere
 Public trust
 Publication bias
 Publication history of The Ego and Its Own
 Publius Clodius Thrasea Paetus
 Publius Egnatius Celer
 Puddle thinking
 Pumping lemma for context-free languages
 Punctuality
 Punishment
 Punk ideologies
 Punk visual art
 Pure practical reason
 Pure reason
 Pure thought
 Purgatory
 Purity of arms
 Purpose of government
 Purposive theory
 Purva Mimamsa
 Purva Mimamsa Sutras
 Pygmalion effect
 Pyotr Chaadayev
 Pyotr Novikov
 Pyrrho
 Pyrrho of Elis
 Pyrrhonian skepticism
 Pyrrhonism
 Pythagoras
 Pythagoreanism
 Python of Aenus

Q 

 Q.E.D.
 Qazi Sa’id Qumi
 Qi
 Qian Dehong
 Qigong
 Qin Hui (historian)
 Qingjing Jing
 Qotb al-Din Shirazi
 Qualia
 Qualification problem
 Qualisign
 Qualitative identity
 Quality-adjusted life year
 Quality (philosophy)
 Quality of life
 Quantification
 Quantifier
 Quantifier elimination
 Quantifier shift
 Quantifier shift fallacy
 Quantity
 Quantum field theory
 Quantum indeterminacy
 Quantum logic
 Quantum measurement problem
 Quantum mechanics
 Quantum mind
 Quantum mysticism
 Quasi-empirical method
 Quasi-empiricism
 Quasi-empiricism in mathematics
 Quasi-quotation
 Quasi-realism
 Quassim Cassam
 Quaternio terminorum
 Queer heterosexuality
 Queer pedagogy
 Queer theory
 Quentin Meillassoux
 Quentin Smith
 QUEST: An African Journal of Philosophy
 Question
 Questionable cause
 Quiddity
 Quietism
 Quietism (Christian philosophy)
 Quine's paradox
 Quine–McCluskey algorithm
 Quinque viae
 Quinque voces
 Quintus Lucilius Balbus
 Quintus Septimus Florens Tertullian
 Quintus Sextius
 Quis custodiet ipsos custodes?
 Quotation

Philosophy